= Juan de Guzmán =

- Tlatoani of Coyoacán
- Reign: 1526–1569
- Predecessor: Hernando Cetochtzin
- Died: 1569
- Wife: A niece of Carlos Ometochtzin
- Issue: Juan; Lorenzo; Hernando
Names
- Juan de Guzmán Itztolinqui
- Father: Quauhpopocatzin
- Mother: The daughter of Huitzilatzin

Don Juan de Guzmán Itztolinqui (reigned 1526–1569) was a post-Conquest tlatoani (ruler) of the altepetl (ethnic state) of Coyoacán in the Valley of Mexico.

Juan de Guzmán's father was Quauhpopocatzin, a previous ruler of Coyoacán, and his mother was a daughter of Huitzilatzin, a ruler of Huitzilopochco. He was thus a great-great-grandson of Huitzilihuitl, the second Aztec ruler of Tenochtitlan. He was installed as tlatoani by Hernán Cortés in 1526, after the death of his elder brother Hernando Cetochtzin in 1525 during Cortés's expedition to Guatemala.

Don Juan married a niece of Carlos Ometochtzin, a Texocan lord who was burnt at the stake in 1539 for continuing to practise the pre-Hispanic religion.

Upon his death, he was succeeded by his son Juan de Guzmán the younger.

== Notes ==
Preceded by Hernando Cetochtzin	Tlatoani of Coyoacán; 1526–1569	Succeeded by Juan de Guzmán the younger
