= Huehue Zaca =

15th-century Aztec noble

Tlacateccatl of Tenochtitlan

Personal details
- Children: Tzontemoc; Huitzilatzin
- Parents: Huitzilihuitl (father); Miyahuaxochtzin (mother)

Huehue Zaca or Çaca (Nahuatl pronunciation: [ˈweːweʔ ˈsaka]), also Zacatzin (Çacatzin, [saˈkatsiːn]), was a 15th-century Aztec noble, prince and a warrior who served as tlacateccatl ("captain general") under the ruler Moctezuma I, his brother. The name of Zaca is probably derived from Nahuatl zacatl, meaning "grass"; -tzin is an honorific or reverential suffix. Huehue is Nahuatl for "the elder", literally "old man".

== Family ==
Zaca was the fourth child of Emperor Huitzilihuitl. His mother was Princess Miyahuaxochtzin, the daughter of Tlacacuitlahuatzin, ruler of Tiliuhcan. He was the younger half-brother of Emperors Chimalpopoca and Moctezuma I. His other brother was prince Tlacaelel.

Moctezuma is said to have had Zaca executed for singing and beating his drum loudly.

Zaca had two sons: Tzontemoc, who served as tlacateccatl under Moctezuma's successors Axayacatl and Tizoc; and Huitzilatzin, who was installed by Axayacatl as the first ruler of Huitzilopochco (now known as Churubusco), a city near Chalco whose inhabitants are said to have been cannibals prior to the imposition of Aztec government. A descendant of Zaca through his son Huitzilatzin, Hernando Huehue Cetochtzin, was taken along with many other indigenous nobles (notably Cuauhtemoc) on conquistador Hernán Cortés's expedition to Honduras (Huey Mollan), during which he died.
