= Tlatolqaca =

- Prince of Tenochtitlan
- Spouse: Princess Matlalxochtzin
- Father: Emperor Acamapichtli
- Mother: Queen Huitzilxotzin

Tlatolqaca (modern Nahuatl pronunciation) (also Tlatolzaca) was an Aztec prince, son of Emperor Acamapichtli and Queen Huitzilxotzin, grandson of Princess Atotoztli I, half-brother of Emperors Huitzilihuitl and Itzcoatl, an uncle of Chimalpopoca and Moctezuma I.

He married Princess Matlalxochtzin and couple had three sons:

- Cahualtzin
- Tetlepanquetzatzin
- Tecatlapohuatzin.
