= Churubusco (disambiguation) =

Churubusco could be referring to:

- Churubusco, a neighbourhood in the Federal District, Mexico
  - Battle of Churubusco, fought there on 20 August 1847
  - Estudios Churubusco, motion picture studios located in the Churubusco district
  - Río Churubusco, a river that formerly ran through the area
- Churubusco, Indiana, United States, a town named after the above battle
- Churubusco, New York, United States, an unincorporated town named in honor of the U.S. troops from New York who fought in the above battle
- Huitzilopochco, a pre-Columbian polity also called Churubusco

== See also ==
- Cherubusco Newton (1848–1910), American politician
