= Miyahuaxochtzin =

- Queen of Tenochtitlan
- Spouse: King Huitzilihuitl
- Issue: Prince Huehue Zaca
- Father: King Tlacacuitlahuatzin

Miyahuaxochtzin of Tiliuhcan was a Queen of Tenochtitlan as a wife of King Huitzilihuitl. She was a daughter of King Tlacacuitlahuatzin and sister of Princess Matlalxochtzin and Queen Tlacochcuetzin. She was the mother of Prince Huehue Zaca and aunt of Princes Cahualtzin, Tetlepanquetzatzin, Tecatlapohuatzin, Coauoxtli and Oquetzal. She was also a grandmother of the King Huitzilatzin.

== Legacy ==
A descendant of Miyahuaxochtzin, Hernando Huehue Cetochtzin, was taken along with many other indigenous nobles on conquistador Hernán Cortés's expedition to Honduras, during which he died.

== See also ==
- List of Tenochtitlan rulers
- Miahuaxihuitl

== Sources ==
- Chimalpahin Cuauhtlehuanitzin, Domingo Francisco de San Antón Muñón (1997). "Mexican History or Chronicle". Codex Chimalpahin: society and politics in Mexico Tenochtitlan, Tlatelolco, Texcoco, Culhuacan, and other Nahua altepetl in central Mexico: the Nahuatl and Spanish annals and accounts collected by don Domingo de San Antón Muñón Chimalpahin Quauhtlehuanitzin. Edited and translated by Arthur J. O. Anderson and Susan Schroeder. Norman: University of Oklahoma Press. pp. 25–177. ISBN 0-8061-2921-2.

Regnal titles
Preceded by Wives of Acamapichtli	Queen of Tenochtitlan; 1396-1417 (estimated)	Succeeded by Wives of Chimalpopoca
