= Tlacacuitlahuatzin =

- King of Tiliuhcan
- Successor: Tzihuactlayahuallohuatzin
- Issue: Miyahuaxochtzin; Matlalxochtzin; Tlacochcuetzin
- Father: Huehuetzin

Tlacacuitlahuatzin (modern Nahuatl pronunciation) was the first ruler of Tiliuhcan, a pre-Columbian Tepanec altepetl (ethnic state) near Tlacopan.

== Family ==
His father was called Huehuetzin.

His daughters Miyahuaxochtzin and Matlalxochtzin married Huitzilihuitl and Tlatolqaca (respectively), sons of Acamapichtli, the first king of Tenochtitlan. Another daughter, Tlacochcuetzin, married Aculnahuacatl Tzaqualcatl, the first king of Tlacopan.

Upon his death, Tlacacuitlahuatzin was succeeded by Tzihuactlayahuallohuatzin, a son of Tezozomoc, the ruler of Azcapotzalco.

Tlacacuitlahuatzin was a grandfather of the prince Huehue Zaca.

== Notes ==
Preceded by —	King of Tiliuhcan	Succeeded by Tzihuactlayahuallohuatzin
