= Tzihuactlayahuallohuatzin =

- King of Tiliuhcan
- Predecessor: Tlacacuitlahuatzin
- Father: King Tezozomoc

Tzihuactlayahuallohuatzin was the second king of Tiliuhcan. He is mentioned in Crónica mexicáyotl.

== Biography ==
Tzihuactlayahuallohuatzin was a son of Tezozomoc, famous king of Azcapotzalco. His brothers were Kings Aculnahuacatl Tzaqualcatl, Quaquapitzahuac, Epcoatl and Maxtla and his sister was a Queen Ayauhcihuatl. He was an uncle of Tlacateotl and Chimalpopoca.

He was installed by his father as the ruler of Tiliuhcan after Tlacacuitlahuatzin's death in the first half of the 15th century.
