= Matlalxochtzin =

15th-century Aztec noblewoman

Matlalxochtzin (modern Nahuatl pronunciation) was a daughter of Tlacacuitlahuatzin, the first tlatoani (ruler) of Tiliuhcan, one of the polities (altepetl) of the Tepanec people in the Valley of Mexico during the Late Postclassic period of Mesoamerican chronology. She was born in Tiliuhcan after her father had been elevated as tlatoani—his father Huehuetzin (Matlalxochtzin's grandfather) had been leader in Tiliuhcan but was only of eagle warrior rank.

Matlalxochtzin and her older sister Miyahuaxochtzin were sent to the Mexica stronghold of Tenochtitlan to marry two sons of Acamapichtli, the founder of the Aztec imperial dynastic line. Miyahuaxochtzin became a wife of Huitzilihuitl while Matlalxochtzin was taken by his younger brother Tlatolqaca.
