= Cacamacihuatl =

- Queen of Tenochtitlan
- Spouse: Huitzilihuitl
- Issue: Tlacaelel I

Cacamacihuatl was a Queen of Tenochtitlan as a wife of the King Huitzilihuitl. She was a mother of Prince Tlacaelel I (born 1397 or 1398) and grandmother of Cacamatzin and Tlilpotoncatzin.

== Family ==
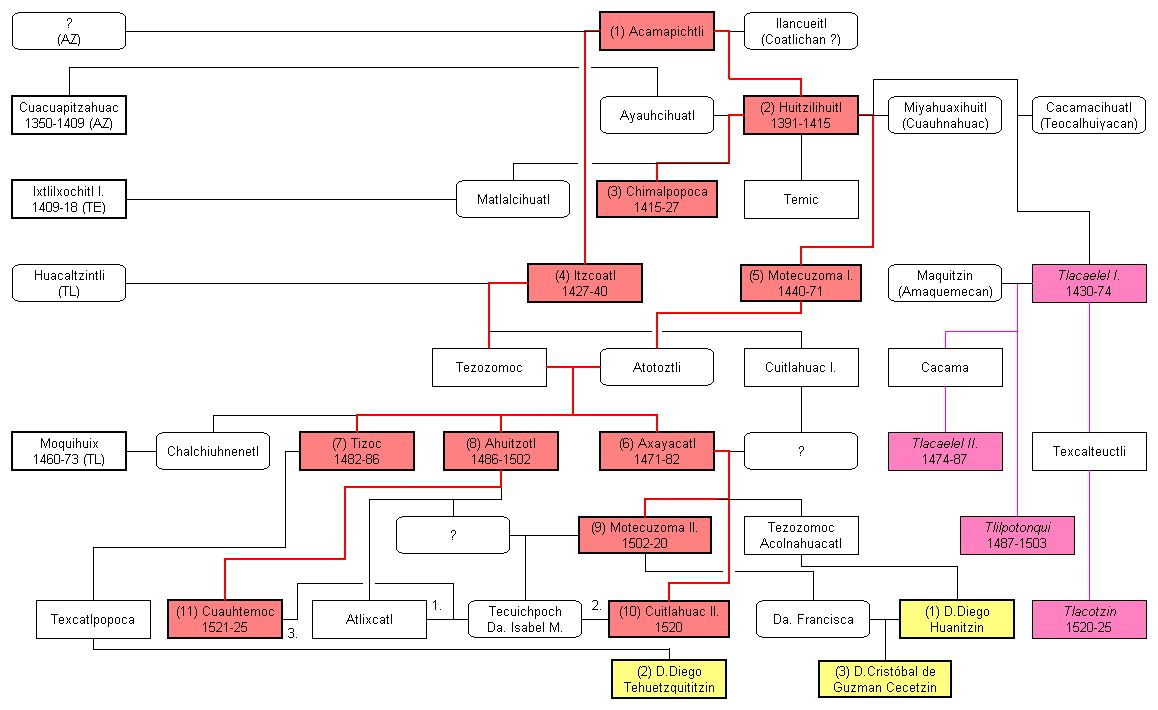
Family tree of Tenochtitlan royal family. Cacamacihuatl's name is here, and also the names of her husband and son

== See also ==
- List of Tenochtitlan rulers
- Ayauhcihuatl

== Notes ==
- Chimalpahin Cuauhtlehuanitzin, Domingo Francisco de San Antón Muñón (1997). "Mexican History or Chronicle". Codex Chimalpahin: society and politics in Mexico Tenochtitlan, Tlatelolco, Texcoco, Culhuacan, and other Nahua altepetl in central Mexico: the Nahuatl and Spanish annals and accounts collected by don Domingo de San Antón Muñón Chimalpahin Quauhtlehuanitzin. Edited and translated by Arthur J. O. Anderson and Susan Schroeder. Norman: University of Oklahoma Press. pp. 25–177. ISBN 0-8061-2921-2.

Regnal titles
Preceded by Wives of Acamapichtli	Queen of Tenochtitlan; 1396-1417 (estimated)	Succeeded by Wives of Chimalpopoca
