= Ayauhcihuatl =

- Empress of Tenochtitlan
- Spouse: Emperor Huitzilihuitl
- Issue: Emperor Chimalpopoca
- Father: Emperor Tezozomoc

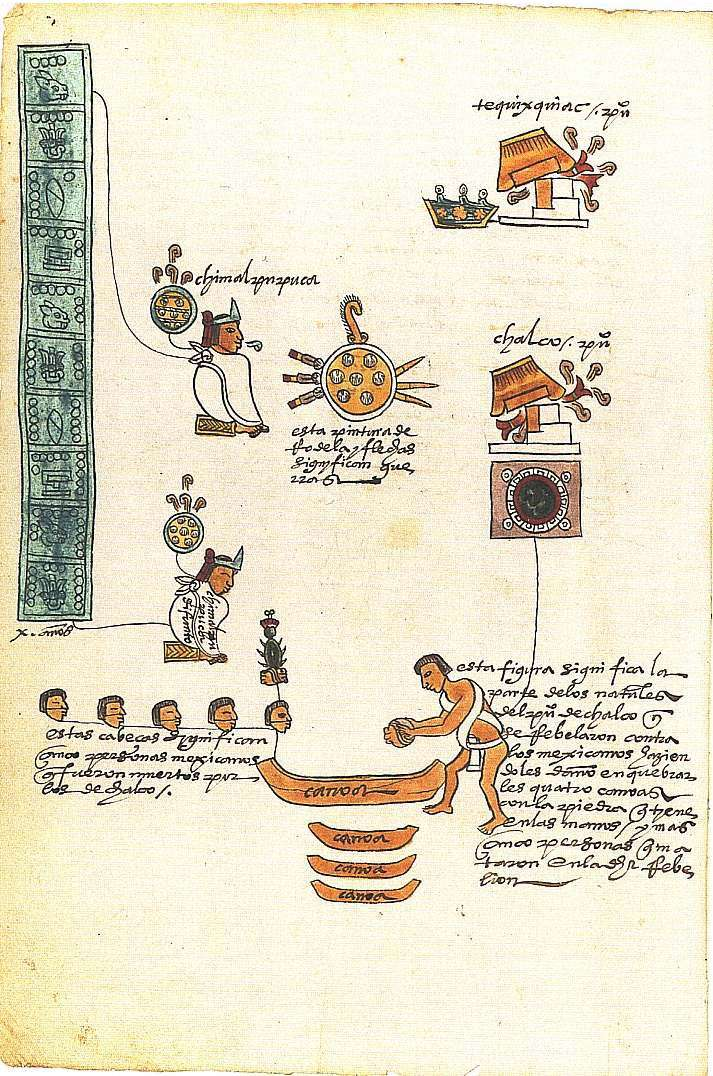
Depiction of Ayauhcihuatl's son Chimalpopoca and his rule

Ayauhcihuatl was a Queen of Tenochtitlan.

== Biography ==
Ayauhcihuatl was born as a princess of Azcapotzalco. She was a daughter of King Tezozomoc and sister of Kings Aculnahuacatl Tzaqualcatl, Quaquapitzahuac, Epcoatl, Tzihuactlayahuallohuatzin and Maxtla. She was sent to Tenochtitlan with many attendants and was very well received. She married a king of Tenochtitlan, Huitzilihuitl, and they had a child, and his successor, Chimalpopoca. Ayauhcihuatl and her son later visited her father.

== Family tree ==
Tezozomoc of Azcapotzalco
Ayauhcihuatl
Chimalpopoca of Tenochtitlan

== See also ==
- List of Tenochtitlan rulers
- Cacamacihuatl

== Notes ==
Regnal titles
Preceded by Wives of Acamapichtli	Queen of Tenochtitlan; 1396-1417 (estimated)	Succeeded by Wives of Chimalpopoca
