= Xihuitl Temoc =

Tlatoani of Tenochtitlan
- Reign: c. 1427
- Predecessor: Chimalpopoca
- Successor: Itzcoatl
- Born: 1400s
- Died: c. 1427
- Father: Chimalpopoca
- Mother: Matlalatzin

Xihuitl Temoc (Classical Nahuatl: Xīhuītl Tēmoc pronounced ['ʃiː.wiːt͡ɬ ˈteː.mok] for "falling comet"), alternatively rendered as Xihuitl-Temoc and Xihuitltemoc (1400s - c. 1427), was, according to the Crónica Mexicayotl, the last king or tlatoani of Tenochtitlan before the formation of the Aztec Empire.

He was reportedly the eldest son and successor of Chimalpopoca, who is more commonly referenced as the last pre-imperial tlatoani. His father died in 1427 under suspicious circumstances, and Xihuitl Temoc became tlatoani for a mere sixty days before his own death.

His identity has been questioned, Carlos Santamaria Novillo proposing he may have been the same figure as Teuctlehuac, another son of Chimalpopoca who had ties to the Tepanecs.

Similarly, Camilla Townsend suggests Xihuitl Temoc may have been a Tepanec puppet installed after Maxtla killed Chimalpopoca, one of the two suspects in the murder of that ruler; the other being his uncle, Itzcoatl. This is also the presumed fate of Xihuitl Temoc, deposition by Itzcoatl and his supporters, after which Itzcoatl became the first Aztec Emperor.

Some authors like Ross Hassig, however, doubt the existence of Xihuitl Temoc, on the grounds no other source mentions him. Though he does offer an alternative, that Xihuitl Temoc was automatically declared king due to his father being the previous tlatoani, and that he was never actually crowned.

Xihuitl Temoc may have been named after a distant ancestor, a political figure of Colhuacan.
