= Huitzilatzin =

- Tlatoani of Huitzilopochco
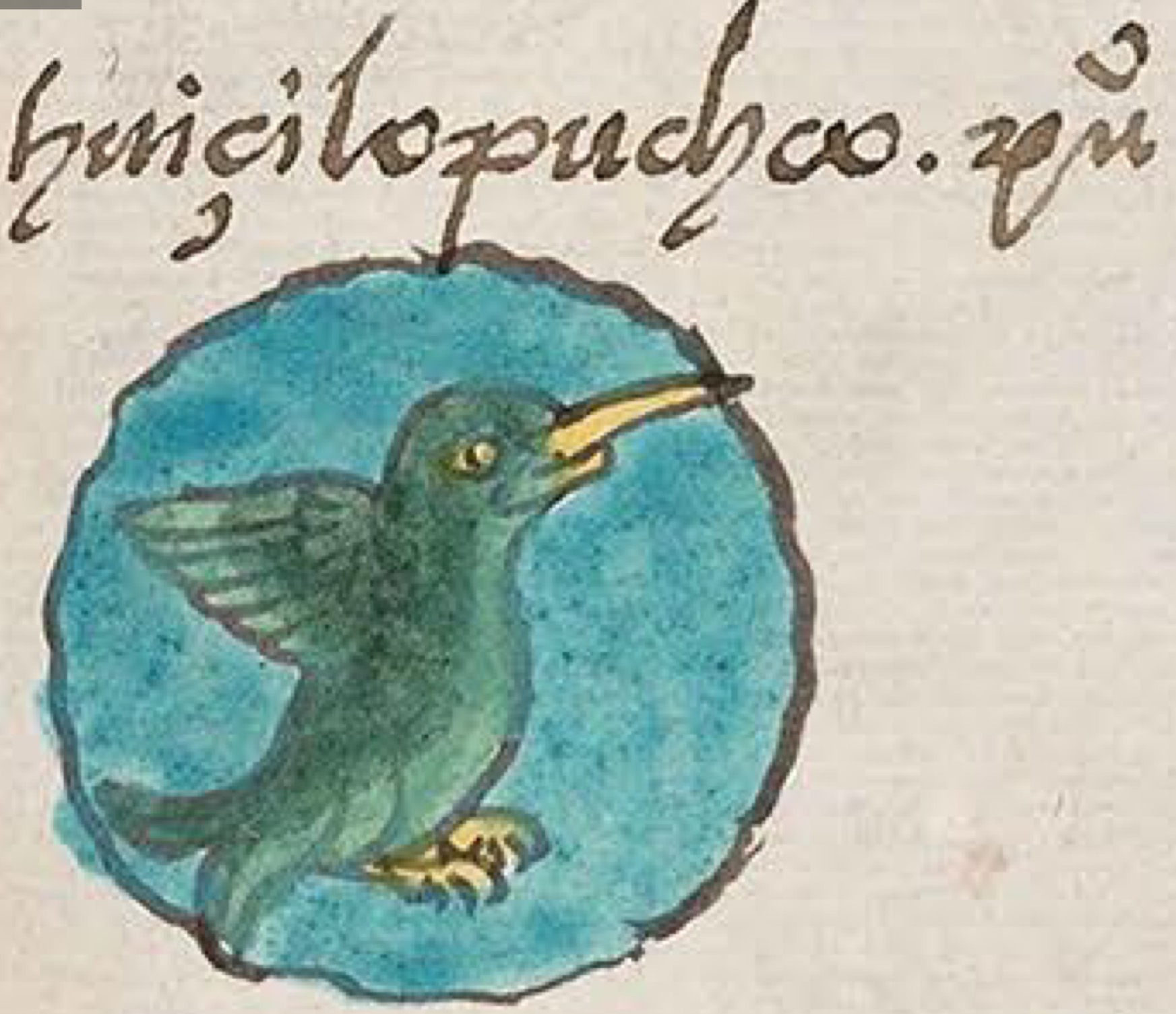
- The glyph for Huitzilopochco
- Successor: Macuilxochitzin
- Born: Mexico Tenochtitlan
- Died: Seven Reed/1499
- Father: Huehue Zaca

Huitzilatzin (or Huitzillatzin) (died in the year Seven Reed/1499) was the first tlatoani (ruler) of the pre-Columbian altepetl (ethnic state) of Huitzilopochco (now Churubusco) in the Valley of Mexico.

Huitzilatzin was the second son of Huehue Zaca, who held the title of tlacateccatl (general) and who was a son of Huitzilihuitl, the second Aztec ruler of Tenochtitlan. According to the Crónica mexicáyotl, Huitzilatzin was "quite sickly" (Nahuatl "çan cocoxcatzintli").

He was installed as ruler of Huitzilopochco by the Aztec ruler Axayacatl. Like other towns in the region, it is not recorded exactly when Huitzilopochco came under Aztec control. It is likely that Tenochtitlan inherited them from the defeated Tepanec empire of Azcapotzalco. The inhabitants of Huitzilopochco are said to have been cannibals prior to the imposition of Aztec government.

Huitzilatzin had two children in Huitzilopochco: a son, Macuilxochitzin, and a daughter, whose name is not known but who married Quauhpopocatzin, the ruler of Coyoacán.

Huitzilatzin was killed in the year Seven Reed (1499), as he was held responsible for flooding that had occurred in Tenochtitlan.

== Notes ==
Preceded by —	Tlatoani of Huitzilopochco ?–1499	Succeeded by Macuilxochitzin
