= Museo Nacional de las Intervenciones =

Museum in Mexico

Coordinates: 19.354648°N 99.149117°W

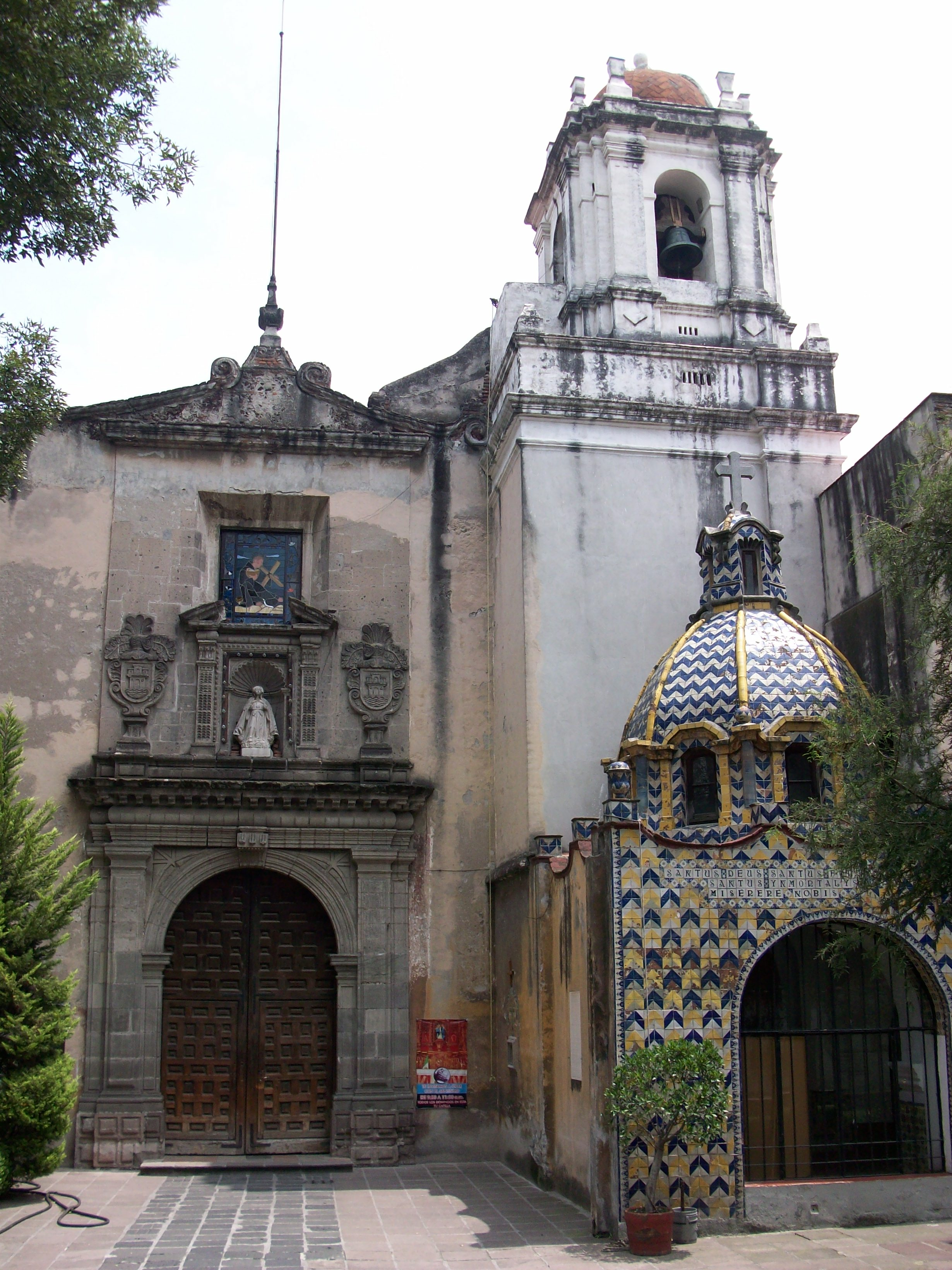
Facade of the ex-monastery/museum

The Museo Nacional de las Intervenciones (National Museum of the Interventions) is located in the former Monastery of San Diego Churubusco, which was built on top of an Aztec shrine. The museum is split into two sections. The downstairs is dedicated to the site’s history as a monastery, and the upstairs rooms are dedicated to artifacts related to the various military conflicts that have taken place on Mexican soil and how these have shaped the modern Mexican republic. The museum is located on Calle 20 de Agosto, one block east from Division del Norte, following Calle Xicoténcatl, in Churubusco. It is one of five museums that are operated directly by the Instituto Nacional de Antropología e Historia (INAH).

== The monastery ==
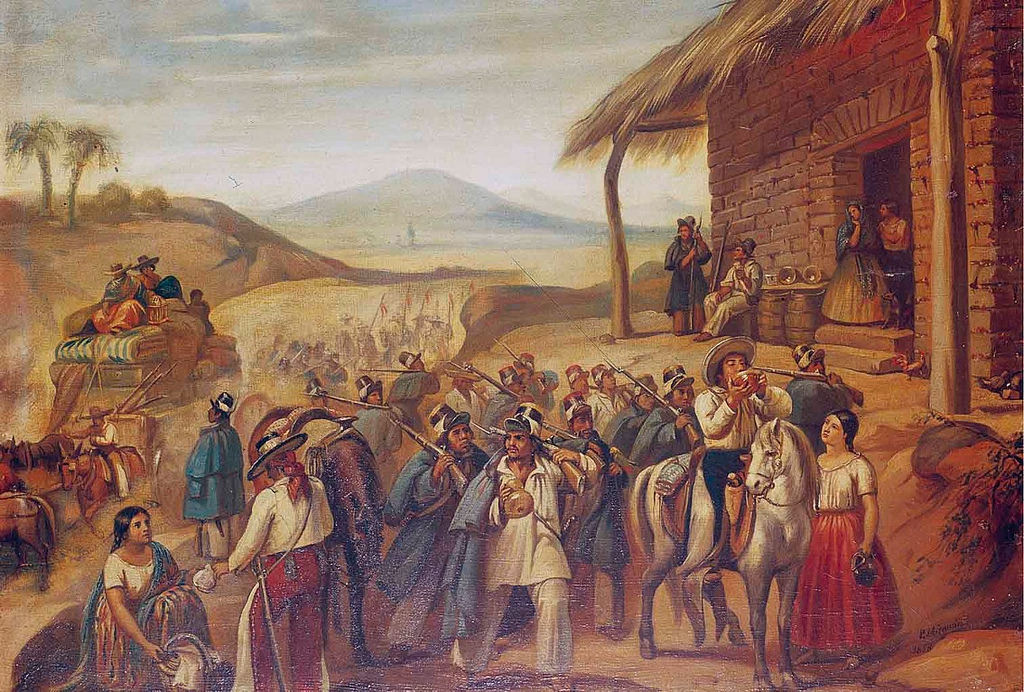
Soldados de la Reforma en una venta (Soldiers of the Reformation in a sale), 1858, oil on canvas, 58.5 x 73 cm, Museo Nacional de las Intervenciones.

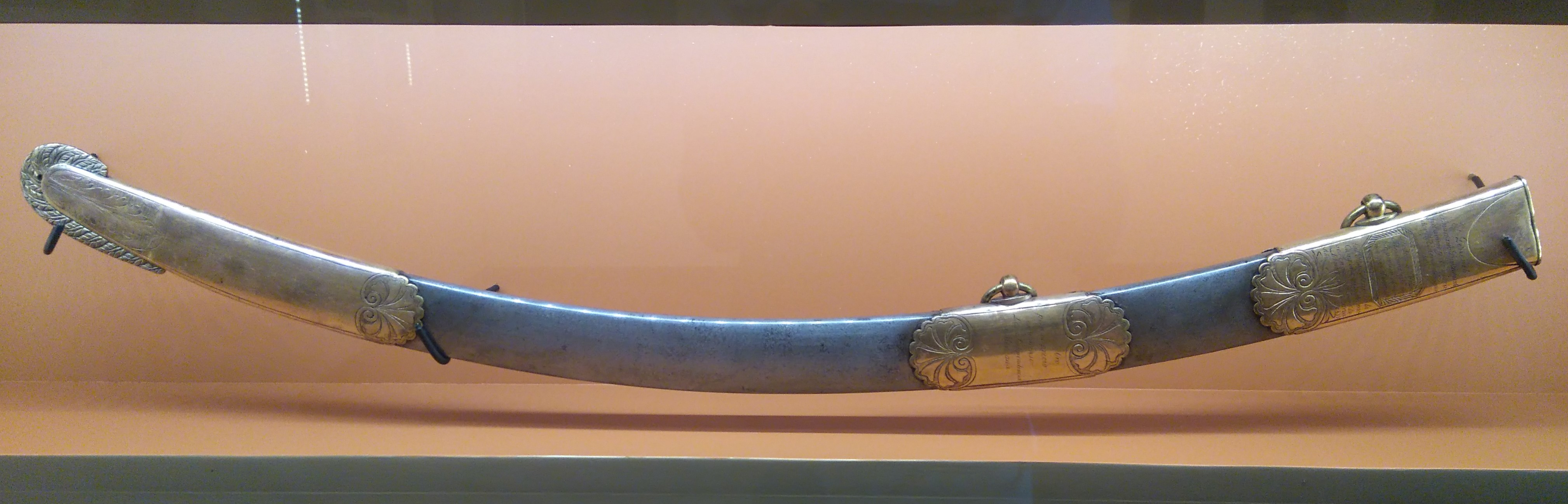
Saber used by Agustín de Iturbide in his triumphal entry into Mexico City on September 27, 1821

Before the Spanish Conquest of Mexico, the land originally belonged to an Aztec lord and was the site of a pyramid shrine to the god Huitzilopochtli. This shrine was eventually destroyed by the Franciscan friars under Pedro del Monte. They Christianized the site using the stones and the foundation of the shrine to build a small church and house for themselves. The current structure was built to replace the smaller house and church near the end of the 17th century. Diego del Castillo and his wife, Elena de la Cruz sponsored the construction which was completed under architect Cristobál Medina Vargas. Work was completed in 1678, and designed to house thirty monks. The Aztec remains lay forgotten until excavation work in the late 20th century uncovered the pyramid foundation, Nahua sculptures, and human remains. Some of these are on display at the museum.

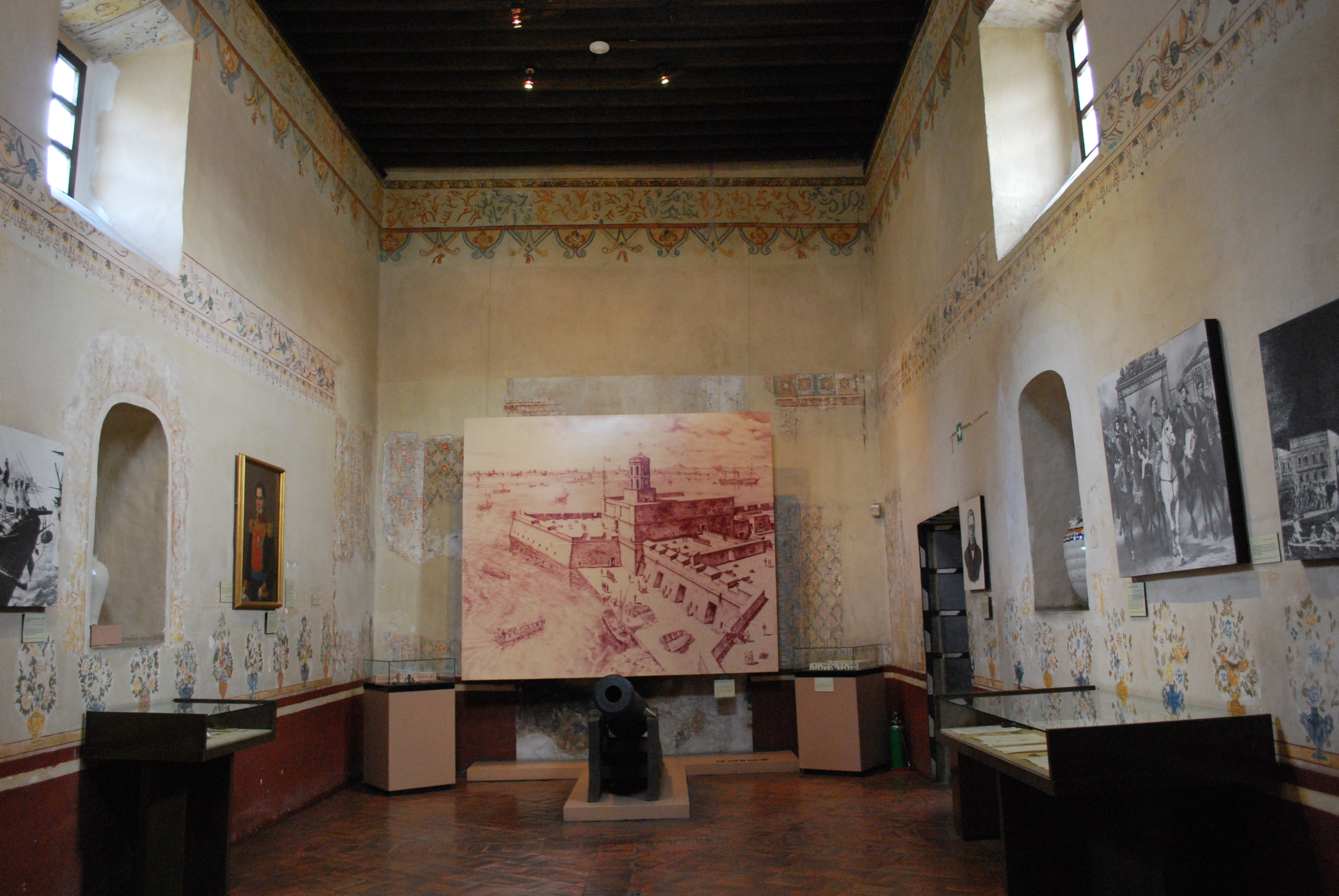
Pastry War Room

The monastery was founded with the full name of "Nuestra Señora de los Angeles de Churubusco" (Our Lady of the Angels of Churubusco), the name of the village. It was founded by the Dieguina (of San Diego de Alcalá) order of Franciscan friars. These monks arrived in Mexico to establish a way station for evangelists heading to Asia, principally the Philippines. This monastery was one of several dedicated to preparing priests and monks for missions in Asia.

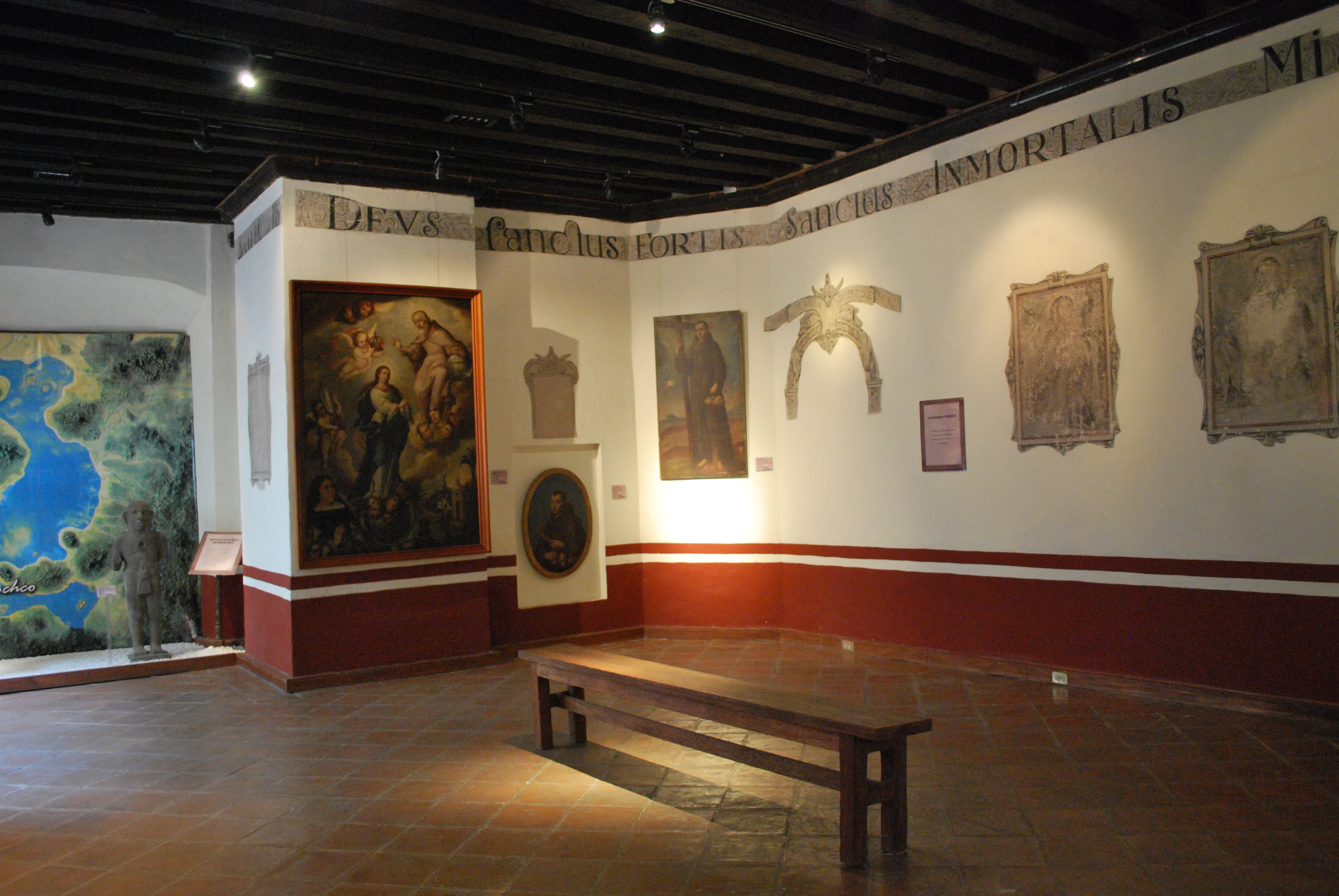
Exhibition room

The church associated with the monastery still maintains its original function but the rest of the complex today is a museum with two focuses. The first floor is dedicated to the history and daily life of the Franciscan Deiguina order, which occupied the site for more than 300 years. The upper floor is dedicated to recalling the various military conflicts that have taken place in Mexican territory.

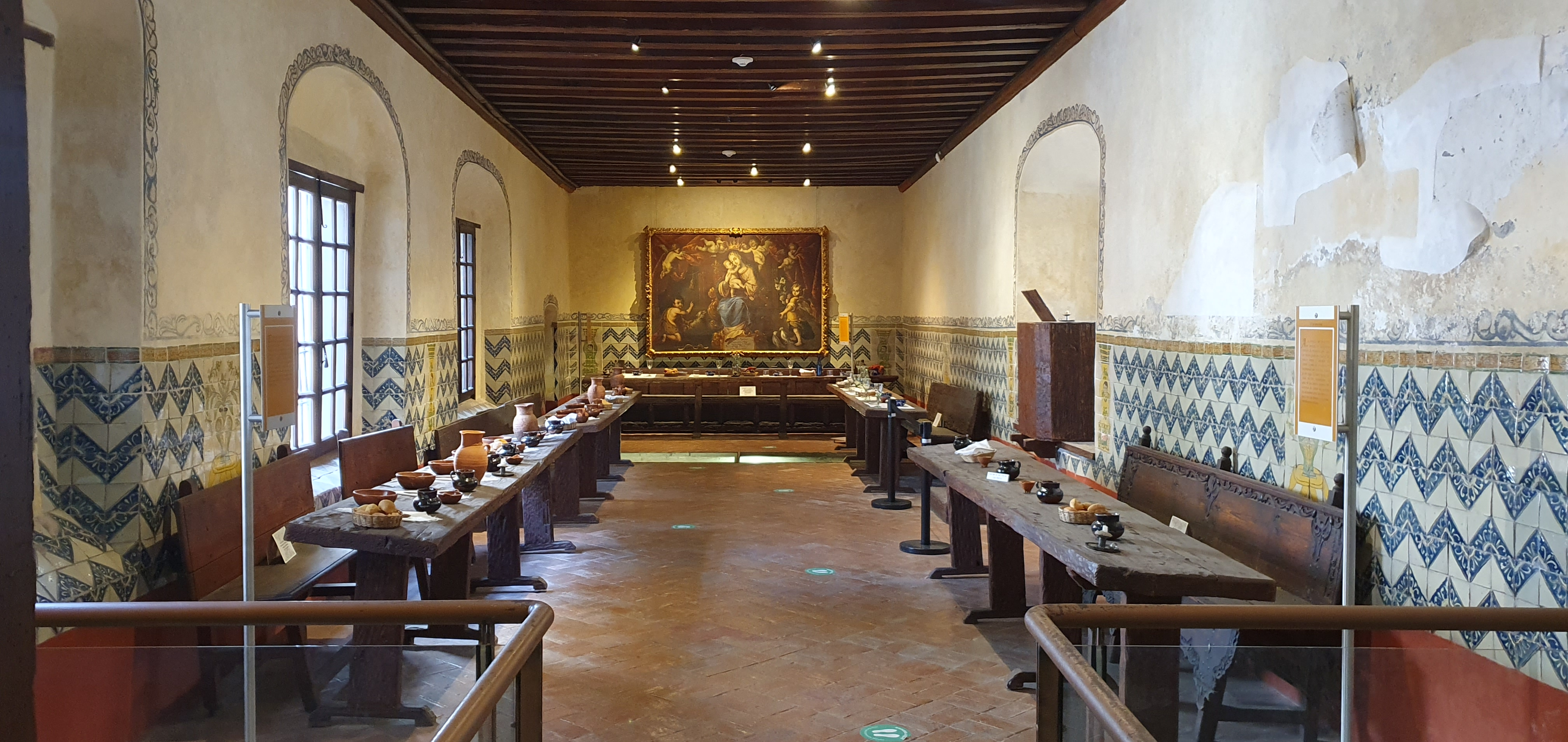
Recreated dining hall of the old monastery and the colonial azulejos of the building

Rooms downstairs such as the kitchen, the refectory, the foyer to the sacristy, the pilgrim’s entrance as well as the garden areas outside have been restored to their original appearance. The kitchen was recreated in 2002, and the refectory, bath area and the foyer were restored in 2005. In addition, a number of other artifacts and spaces have been preserved, such as the excavations of the monastery foundations and its pre-Hispanic predecessors, but they are not available to the public. Most of the preserved downstairs rooms are related to the feeding and other necessities of the monks, such as the kitchen, the dining room and the bath area and generally were not open to the public. The lower cloister, the foyer to the sacristy and the portals were public spaces. There is also fountain inside the main patio that provided water for the monks and the surrounding community. The main garden contained and orchard which grew fruit and other foods for consumption by the monastery’s inhabitants. The "patio menor" on the side of the complex is where monks could converse with those visiting the facility.

The downstairs also contains a collection of paintings and sculptures from the 17th to the 19th centuries. The Churubusco Collection Room is primarily devoted to colonial-era paintings by Juan Correa, Cristóbal de Villalpando, Nicolás Rodríguez Juárez and others. The collection also includes some sculptures and woodwork, usually representing angels, saints and the Virgin Mary. In the main stairwell, there are a number of large oil paintings. Two of the pieces has scenes from the life of Saint Francis of Assisi, called "El transito de San Francisco" (The Death of Saint Francis of Assisi) and "San Francisco como el Profeta Elías" (Saint Francis of Assisi as the Prophet Elijah). There is one other painting here called "La Elevación de San Juan Nepomuceno" (The Elevation of Saint John Nepomuk).

The upper floor and cloister was where the monks slept, studied and prayed and was not open to the public. These areas have not been restored to their original appearance but instead have been converted to a military museum, reflecting the site’s later history.

== The Battle of Churubusco ==
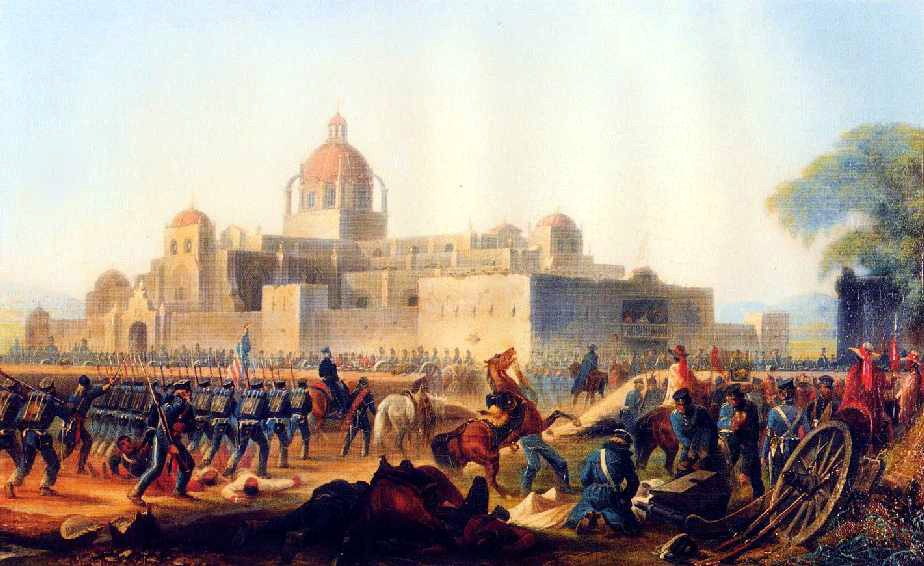
Churubusco's monastery at the height of the 1847 Battle of Churubusco, painted by James Walker

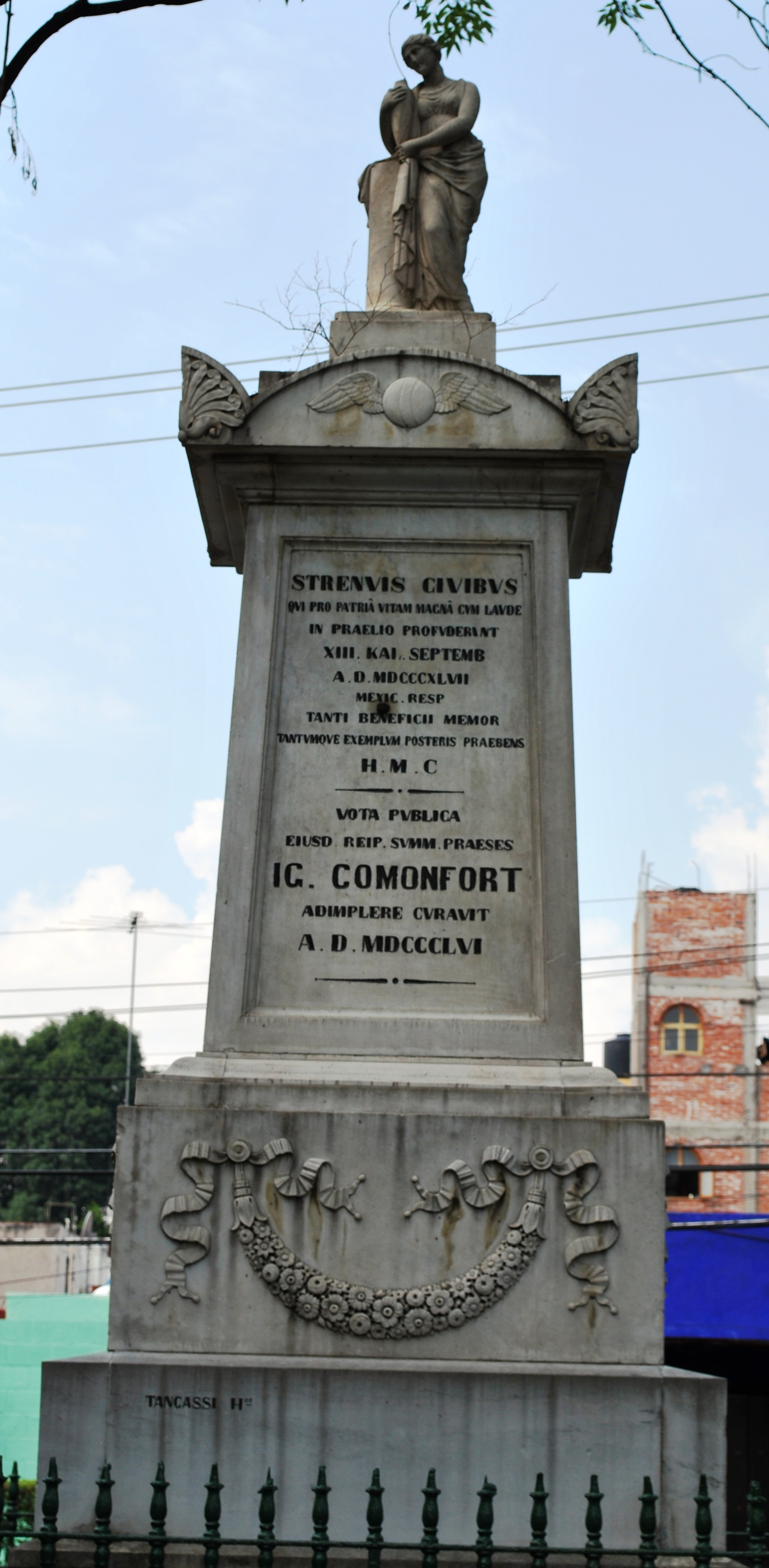
Monument to Battle of Churubusco outside main entrance

The Mexican Army dislocated the monks living here during the Mexican-American War in order to defend Mexico City from the invading U.S. Army. The Mexicans fortified the building, which included building the parapet. At the time, the complex was far outside the city limits. On 20 August 1847, Battle of Churubusco was fought. When the Mexicans ran out of ammunition, the battle turned to hand-to-hand fighting. When the Mexicans were defeated U.S. General David Twiggs asked General Pedro María de Anaya to surrender his ammunition. The reported response of Anaya is "If there was any, you wouldn't be here." This was also the last stand of Saint Patrick's Battalion, a regiment of mostly Irish defectors from the U.S. army. A plaque honoring them is placed at the main entrance. In 1869, President Benito Juárez declared the site a national monument in honor of the battle, which was reaffirmed in 1933. However, this did not turn it into a museum. From 1876 to 1914, it served as a military hospital, specializing in contagious diseases. In the 1920s, it was an art school, and from 1920 to 1960 it was a depot. In the 1960s and 1970s, this building was known unofficially as the Transport Museum as a large number of old vehicles were stored there. This collection was eventually sent to Zacatecas in 1985.

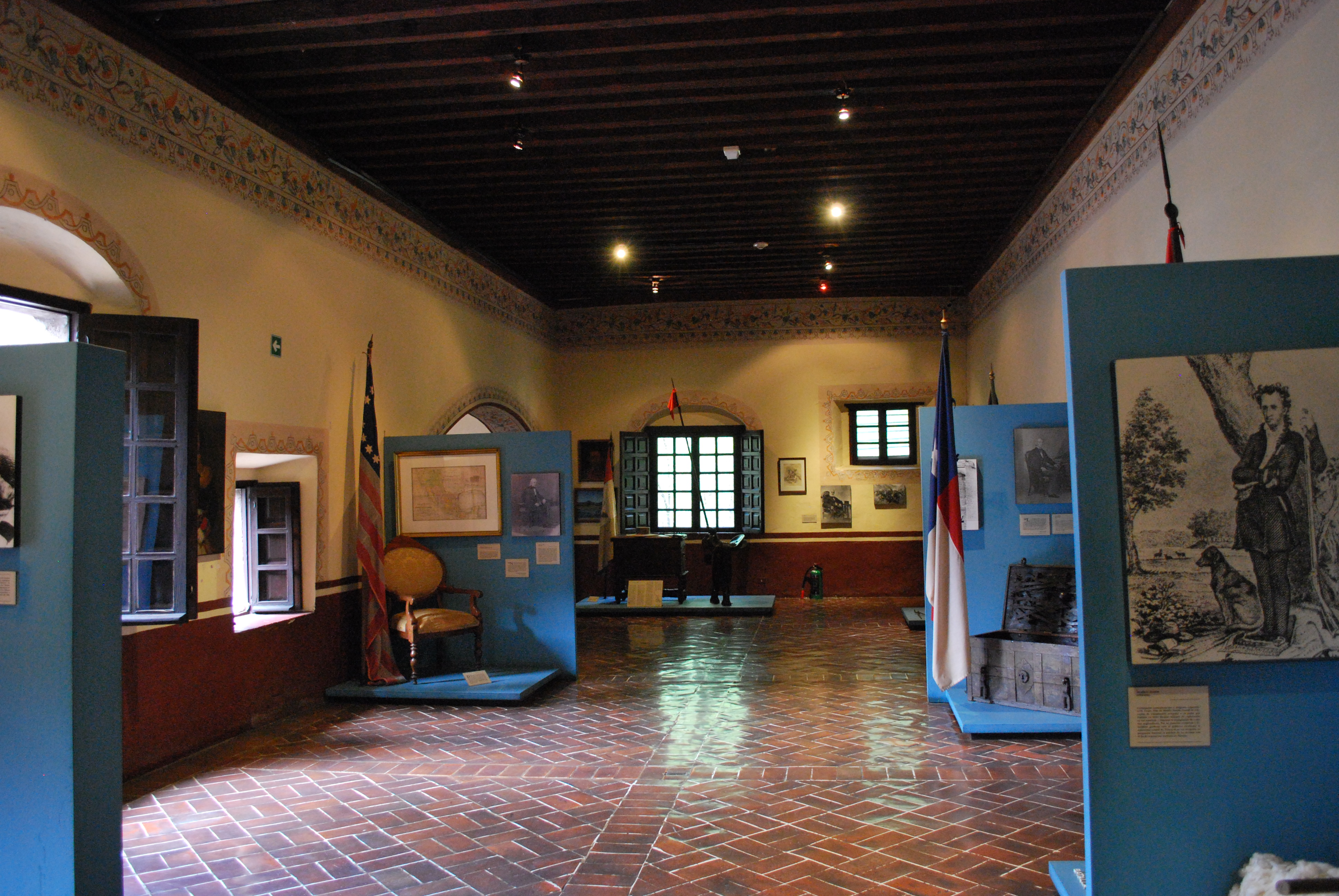
Part of the room dedicated to the Mexican–American War

The idea of the Museo Nacional de las Intervenciones emerged in 1980 with the objective of unifying the collection of artifacts and documents related to the various military conflicts on Mexican soil, most of which involve foreign intervention. The building was chosen as the site of this museum because of its role during the Mexican–American War between 1846 and 1848. The outside walls still contain marks from the bullets and cannons from the U.S. army, especially near the main entrance. The presidential decree was issued on 13 September 1981 stating the museum’s purpose as "to explain the different armed interventions experienced by Mexico, from which has derived her basic principles of her foreign policy: non-intervention and the self-determination of peoples." The adjoining plaza contains a monument to General Anaya, who headed the Mexican army during the Battle of Churubusco in with 1,300 Mexicans against 6,000 U.S. troops.

== Displays related to the "Intervenciones" ==
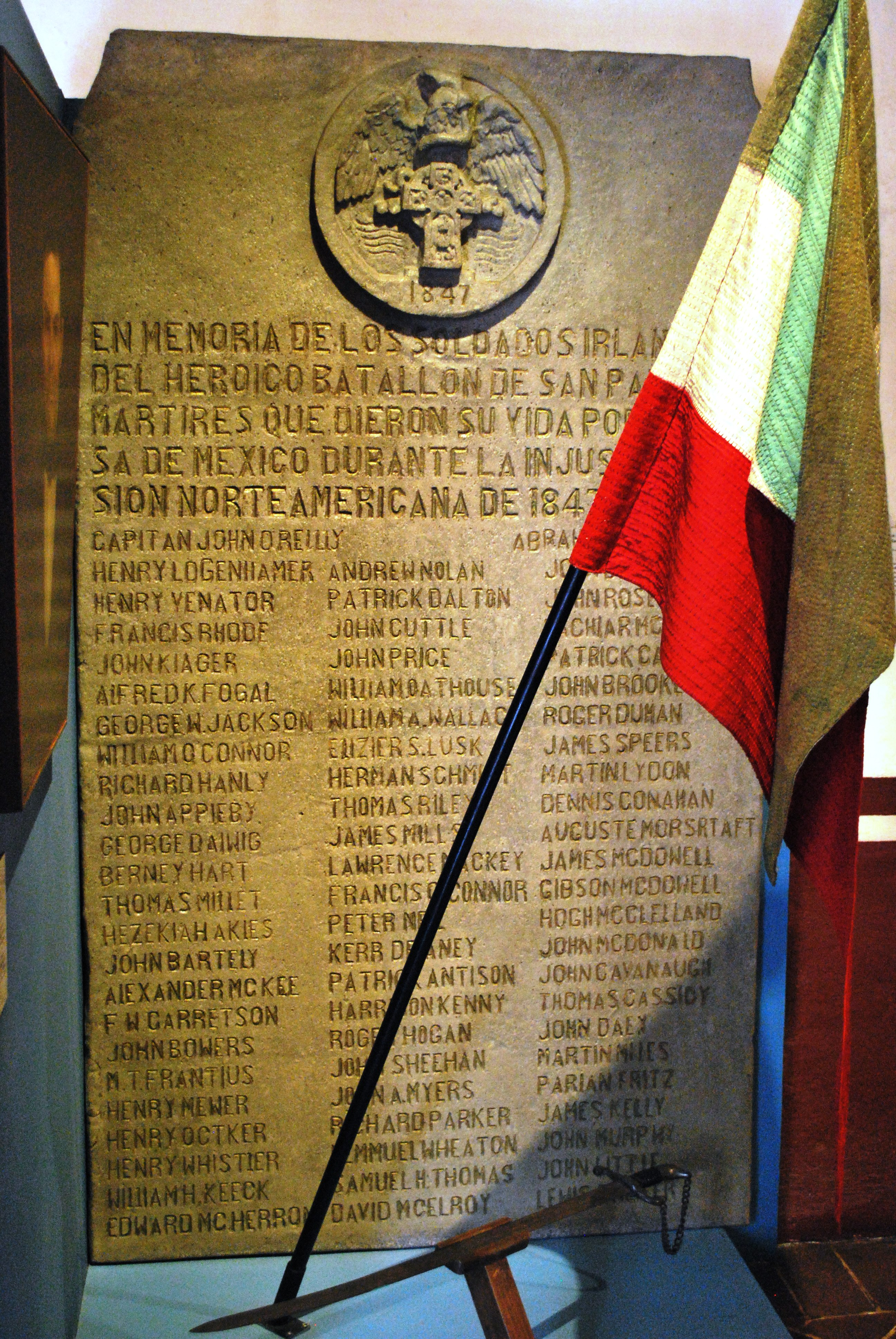
Tribute to the Irish soldiers of the Saint Patrick's Battalion who switched sides during the Mexican–American War.

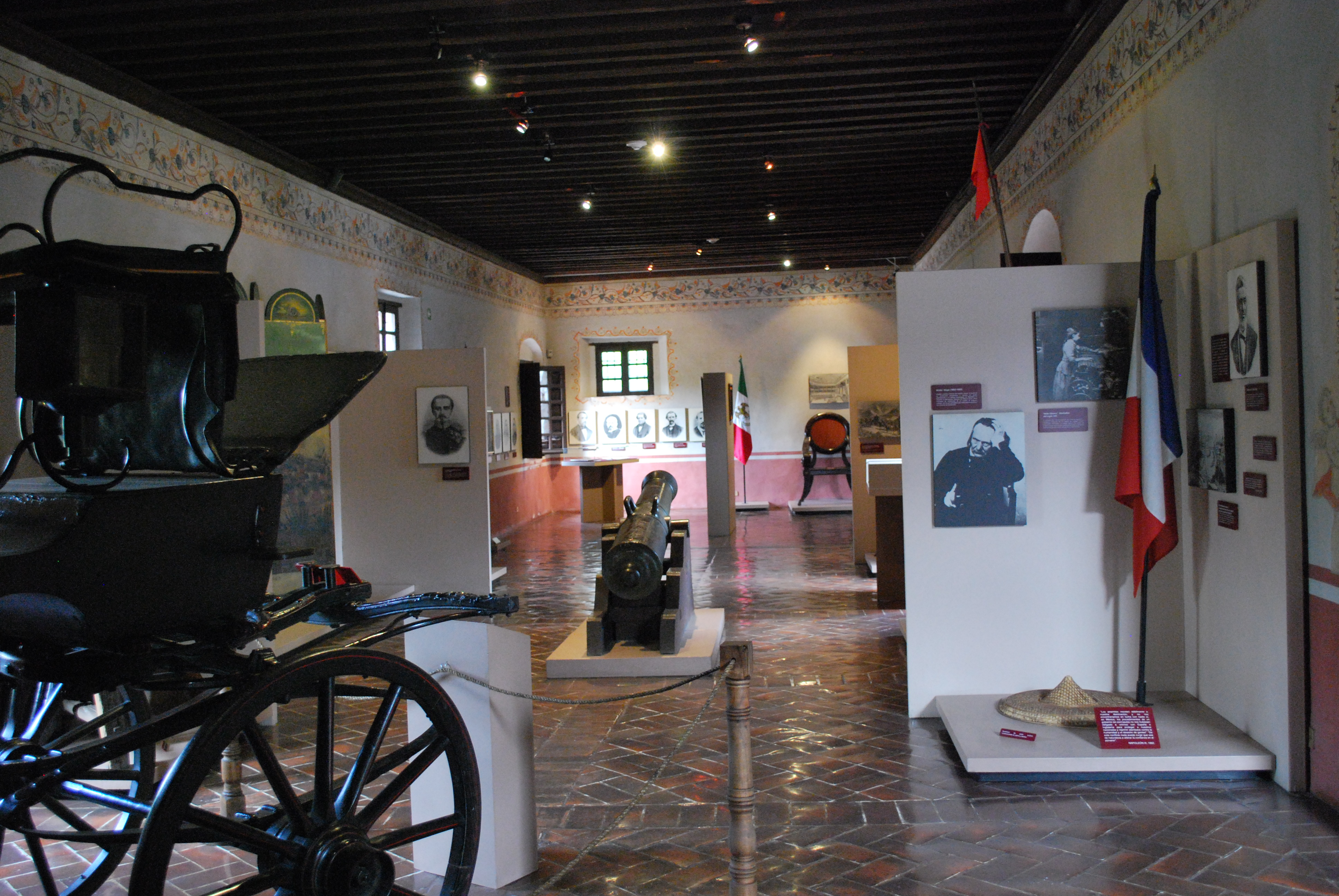
Room dedicated to the French Intervention in Mexico.

In addition to the cannon, memorials and plaques placed outside the main monastery entrance in honor of the Battle of Churubusco, the second floor of the building itself is dedicated to the Mexican–American War and various other conflicts on Mexican soil between 1825 and 1916. This period in Mexican history is characterized by near-constant intervention by the governments of the United States, Spain and France in Mexico's internal affairs, ranging from political intrigue, diplomatic maneuvers and armed invasion to assert control over all or part of Mexico’s territory.

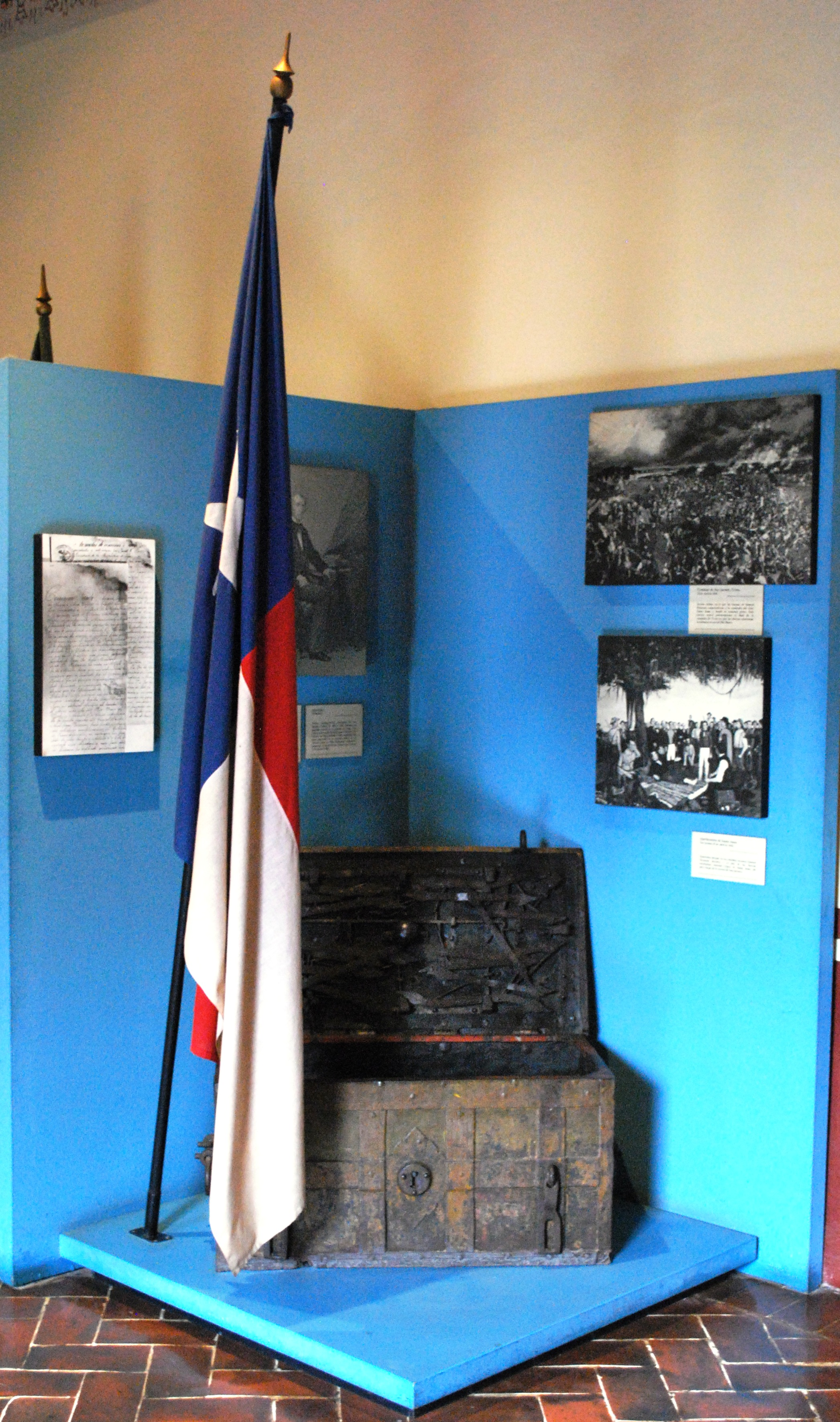
Republic of Texas flag flown at the Alamo

The military conflicts are represented here in chronological order, starting from the Mexican War of Independence to the early 20th century. Its collection includes lithographs, military flags, weapons, furniture, drawings, paintings, photographs, maps, documents, and weapons such as cannons, rifles, pistols, bullets, swords and machetes. There are textiles such as flags and uniforms with accompanying insignia and medals. Most are originals but some are reproductions.

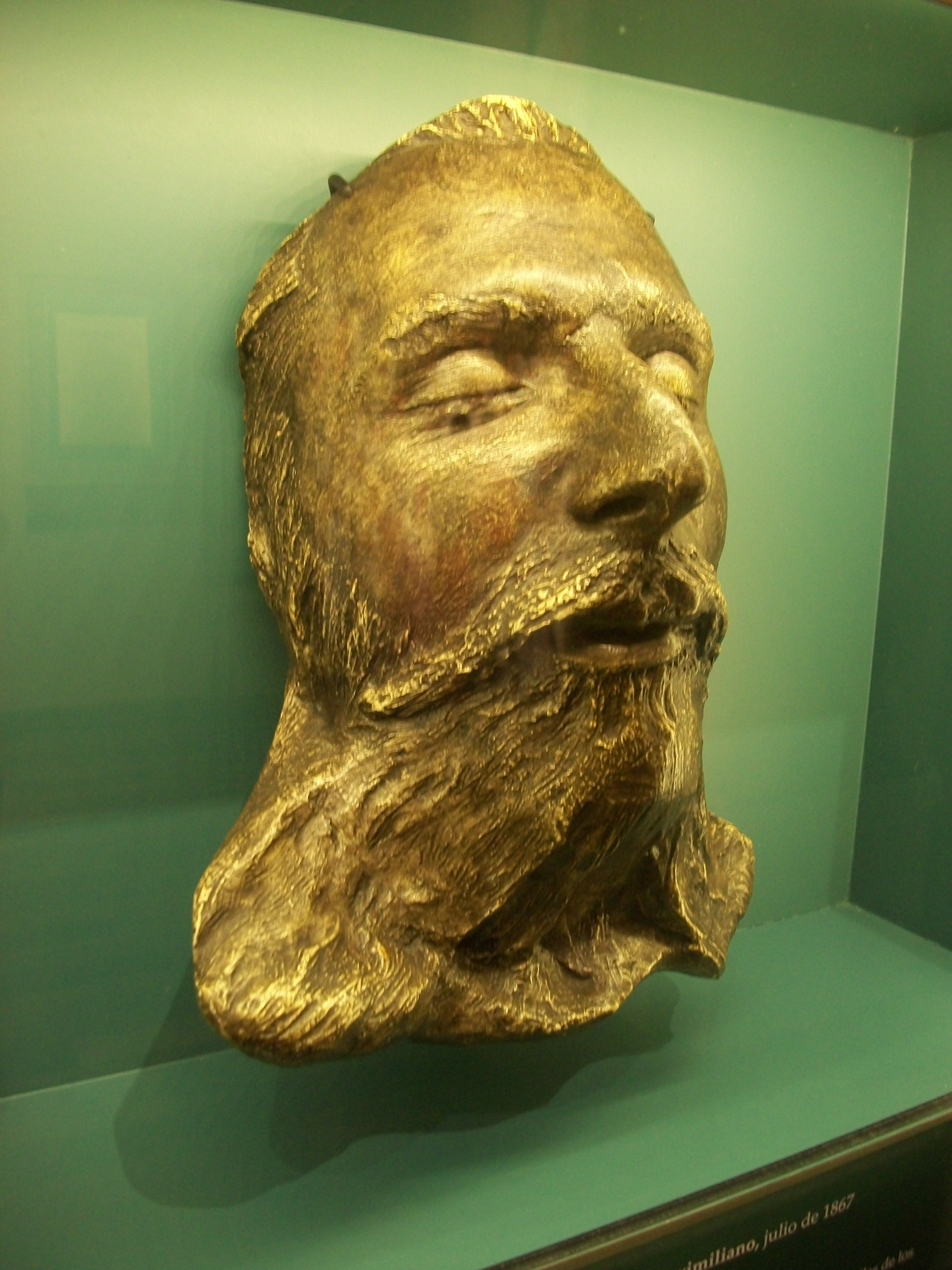
Death mask of Emperor Maximilian I of Mexico

The museum is spread out over ten halls with the intention of explaining the historical processes of each of the military conflicts. It starts with an Introductory Hall at the top of the stairs, which is dedicated to showing the forms of fighting adopted in Mexico and the development of U.S. expansionism. The Hall of Independence contains explanations as to how Mexico gained her independence from Spain to the government of General Guadalupe Victoria from 1810 to 1829. The Spanish Intervention of 1829 Room is dedicated to Spain's attempt to reclaim its former colony as well as U.S. attempts to buy Texas. The room dedicated to the Pastry War (1838–1839), also called the First French Intervention, is dedicated to the conflict between France and Mexico over trade issues and its eventual end through negotiation. The Mexican–American War Room (1846–1848) begins with Mexico's loss of Texas, which then annexed itself to the United States and how conflict over this event eventually led to war between the U.S. and Mexico. It covers how the U.S. invaded Mexican territory and ended with a peace treaty which required Mexico to give up much of its northern territory. Displays include the Texan flag flown at the Alamo and U.S. military maps of the 1847 battle in Churubusco, noting how much the monastery was separated from the city at that time. The (Second) French Intervention in Mexico (1862–1867) is represented in a room which focuses on the role of President Benito Juarez in the conflict. This is then followed by a room dedicated to the "Restored Republic." It focuses on how the interventions up until that time shaped the Republic and how Mexico entered the world market as a supplier of raw materials.

The Porfiriato Room is concerned with the thirty-year-long presidency of Porfirio Diaz. Diaz's regime was primarily concerned with the modernization of the economy and resulted in the concentration of power and wealth among the Mexican elite. The room serves as a context to understand why the Mexican Revolution happened. The Mexican Revolution Room traces the progress of the civil struggle for power from its beginnings in 1910 to its end in 1916 and how foreign influences affected the conflict. There are also artifacts related to U.S. invasion during this event from 1914 to 1916.

In 2006, a multipurpose room called "Gaston Garcia Cantú" and the El Catalejo Library were opened. The latter offers visitors access to books, videos, sound recordings and other resources related to the history of Mexico.

Still in the planning stages are exhibits which will portray the Mexican government's interventions, and eventual conquests, of the indigenous peoples within its territory, including the Apache.

== See also ==
- List of colonial churches in Mexico City
