= Churubusco =

Neighborhood in Mexico City, Mexico

Churubusco is a neighbourhood of Mexico City. It is a part of the borough (delegación) of Coyoacán. It is centred on the former Franciscan monastery (ex convento de Churubusco) at 19°21′20″N 99°8′55″W.

The name "Churubusco" is the interpretation the Spanish invaders gave to the original Nahuatl name Huitzilopochco – meaning "place of Huitzilopochtli". Earlier attested forms that the adapted name took include Huycholopuzco, Ocholopusco, Ochoroposco, Uchilubusco, and Chulibusco.

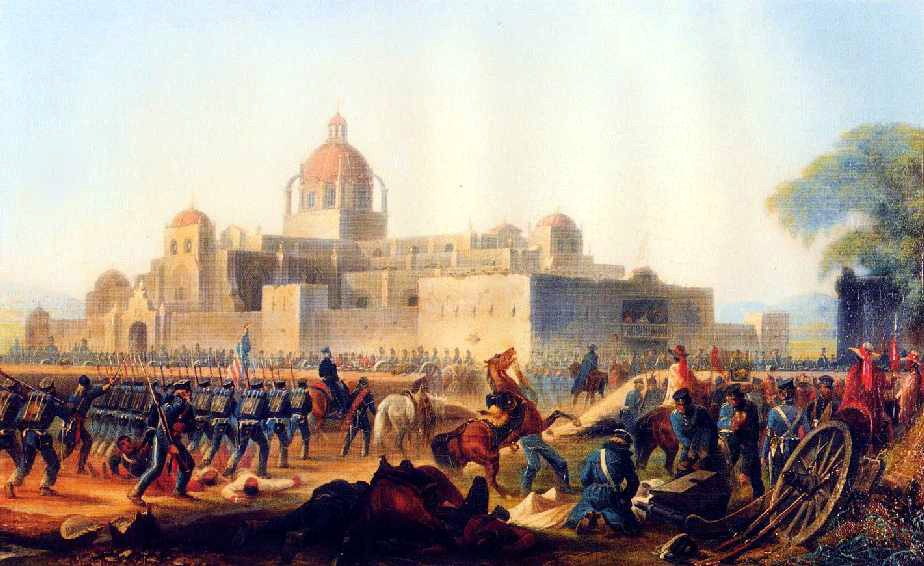
Churubusco's monastery at the height of the 1847 Battle of Churubusco

== History ==
=== 11th century ===
The first settlers are believed to have arrived in the area, possibly fleeing the fall of the Toltec Empire.

=== 15th century ===
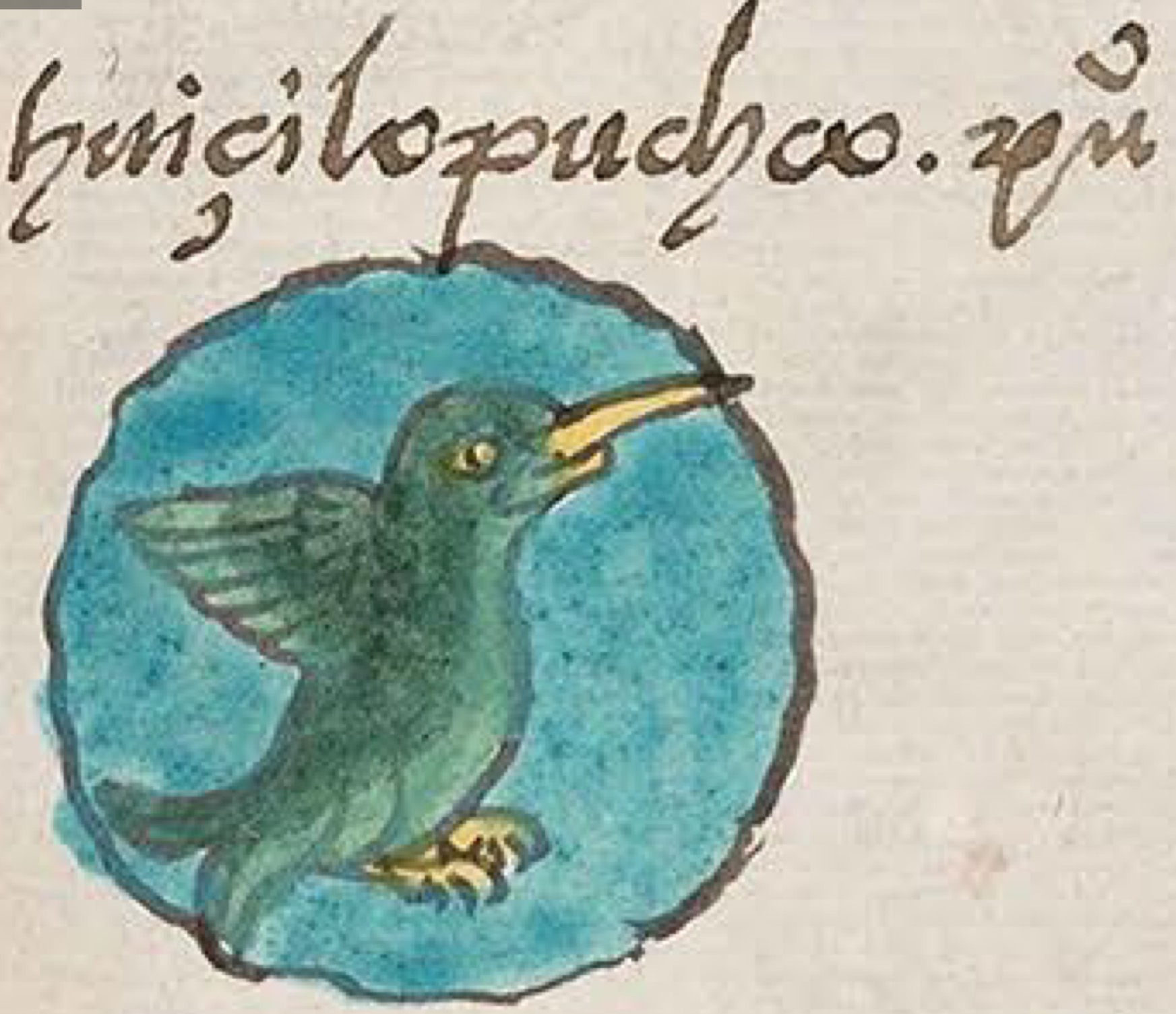
The Aztec glyph for Huitzilopochco.

Huitzilopochco existed as an independent lordship within Mexico-Tenochtitlan. Its first ruler was Huitzilatzin, a grandson of Huitzilihuitl, the second Tlatoani ("emperor"). Its population numbered some 15,000 dedicated to the cultivation of fruit and flowers and the extraction of salt from the neighboring Lake Texcoco.

A temple (teocalli) dedicated to the worship of Huitzilopochtli stood at a location known as Teopanzolco. Within the Aztec Empire, this teocalli ranked second only to the one at the Templo Mayor in Mexico-Tenochtitlan (some 10 km to the north). Huitzilopochco was famous for the hummingbird feathers (sacred to Huitzilopochtli) that it sent in tribute to the capital.

=== 16th century ===
In 1503, Ahuitzotl, the eighth Tlatoani, connected a nearby spring to the Mexico-Tenochtitlan water supply. This is believed to have been the direct cause of the great flood of that year that devastated the city and claimed hundreds of lives – including that of Ahuitzotl.

During Hernán Cortés's siege of Mexico-Tenochtitlan in 1521, Huitzilopochco was razed to the ground. Some years later, Franciscan friars founded a small convent in the Teopanzolco district, using stones from the destroyed teocalli of Huitzilopochtli. The convent was dedicated to Mary, Queen of Angels. The Franciscans appear to have abandoned it shortly after; the church was transferred to the care of the regular clergy and, in 1580, responsibility for the convent was handed to a second group of Franciscan friars (discalced dieguinos). They rebuilt the monastery and added a novitiate and a school.

=== 17th century ===
In the second half of this century, thanks to the generosity of one Diego del Castillo and his wife, the monastery was completely rebuilt and much expanded. Rededicated in 1678, it now consisted of an oratory, dormitories, schoolrooms, a library, a refectory, upper and lower cloisters, a dispensary and an apothecary, and an Andalusian-style courtyard built around a well.

=== 18th century ===
A series of enhancements were made to the monastery and its church, including a churrigueresque altar dedicated to Our Lady of Guadalupe in 1766 and the installation of an organ in 1791. In 1797 an independent chapel, dedicated to Saint Anthony of Padua, was erected.

=== 19th century ===
Battle of Churubusco. On 20 August 1847, during the U.S. invasion of Mexico, a bloody and decisive battle was fought in Churubusco – specifically, in the vicinity of the monastery.

In 1857, President Ignacio Comonfort had a monument commemorating the heroic defence of the monastery built in front of its main gates. The remains of Francisco Peñúñuri and Luis Martínez de Castro, two army officers who led their men to perish in a desperate bayonet charge after running out of ammunition during the battle, were interred inside.

In 1869, during the Reform period under President Benito Juárez, the monastery was taken over by the state. It was converted into a military hospital specialising in contagious diseases.

=== 20th century ===
In 1917, the National University's Inspectorate of Artistic and Historic Monuments managed to convince the authorities that the former monastery would fare better as a museum: as a hospital, it had been more than a little neglected and was in danger of collapse. The museum was opened to the public in 1921.

With the rapid expansion of Mexico City during the mid-20th century, Churubusco ceased to be a separate village and was swallowed up by the urban sprawl of the capital. The motion picture production facility of Estudios Churubusco – the nerve centre of the Golden Age of Mexican Cinema – opened in the district in 1945.

=== Present day ===
The former monastery of Churubusco now houses the state-run "Interventions Museum" (Museo de las Intervenciones), documenting the different assaults on its territorial integrity that Mexico has suffered since declaring its independence in 1810: 1829 (Spain), 1838 (France), 1846 (United States), 1862 (France), and 1916 (United States). It stands in a residential neighbourhood just outside the southernmost loop of the inner ring-road, in the middle of a pleasant, wooded plaza.

Metro General Anaya (named for Pedro María Anaya) is located in the vicinity. Other nearby street names commemorating the area's history include "Calle Héroes del 47", "Calle 20 de Agosto", and "Calle Mártires Irlandeses".

== Institutions ==
=== Transportation ===
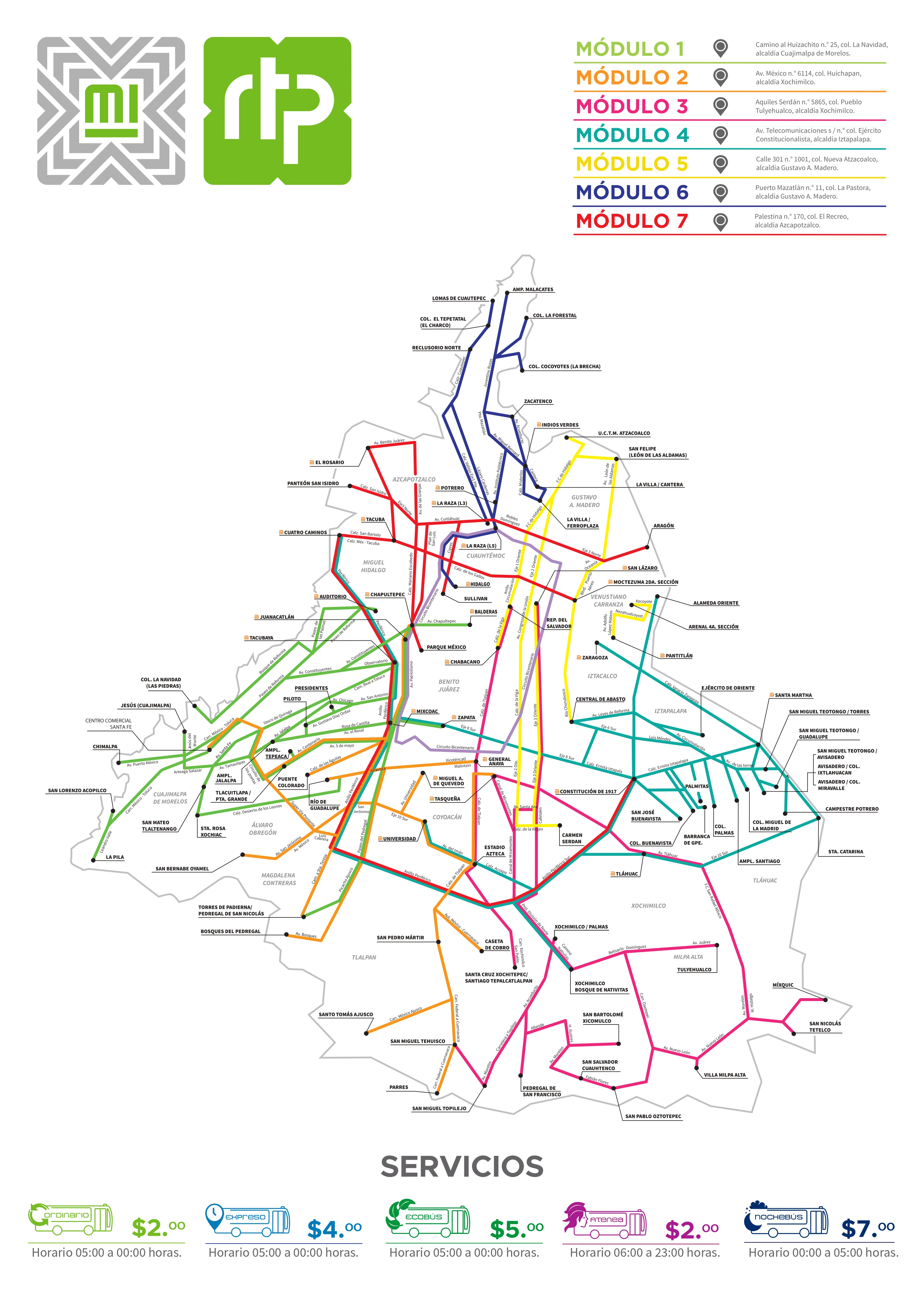
Map of RTP routes in Mexico City; Module 01 (Green) and Module 03 (Pink) intersect Churubusco via Calzada de Tlalpan.

==== Metro ====
Mexico City has a rapid-transit metro system which services Churubusco through Mexico City Metro Line 2 (Linea 2), also known as Blue Line (Linea Azul). The metro station is General Anaya metro station, and there is also Tasqueña metro station immediately south. Tasqueña station is the southernmost station of Line 2, at which point it connects to the light rail line.

Bus

- Churubusco is serviced by microbus routes 17A-L at stations across Tlalpan.
- Churubusco is serviced by Mexico City's Red de Transporte de Pasajeros through Route 116-A of Module 01, and Route 145-A of Module 3.

==== Taxicab ====
There are many taxicab services operating within, to, and from Churubusco.

- The Mexico City taxi system operates licensed and government-authorised taxicabs. These are generally safer and more inexpensive than rideshare companies.
- There are many Ridesharing companies, such as DiDi and Uber, as well as AmorrAs, which is a women-only rideshare service operating in Mexico City.

=== Education ===
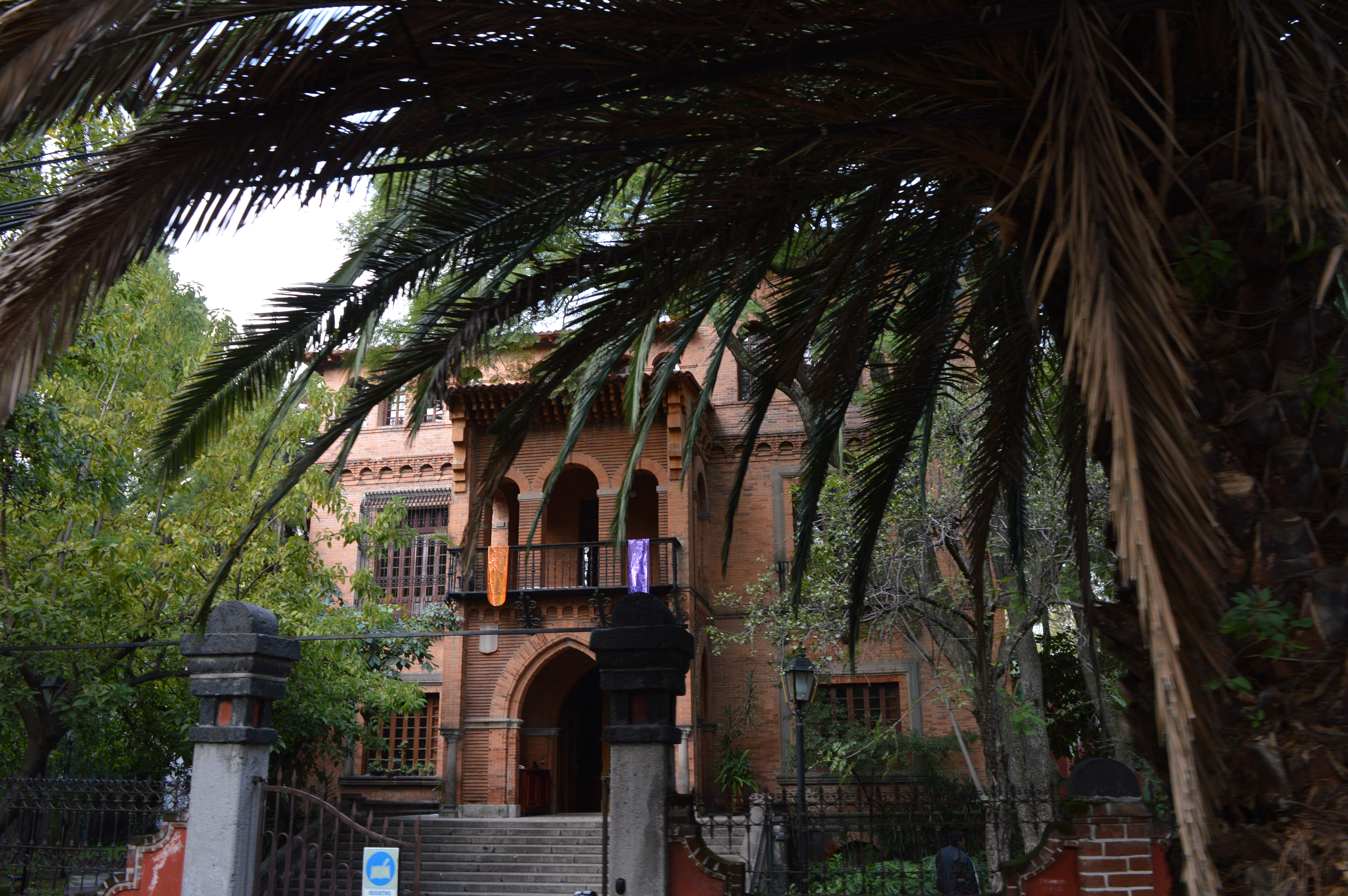
Escuela Superior de Musica

Churubusco is home to the following educational institutions:

- Escuela Superior de Musica, and Escuela Superior de Arte Teatral, operated by the Instituto Nacional de Bellas Artes y Literatura
- Ann Matthews Baccalaureate Institute

There are many public primary schools in Churubusco, but only one preparatory school, which is Escuela Nacional Preparatoria 6 "Antonio Caso". An additional preparatory school serving students in Churubusco is CECyT #13 "Ricardo Flores Magón", in nearby colony Paseos de Taxqueña.

== Community and Culture ==
=== Recreation ===
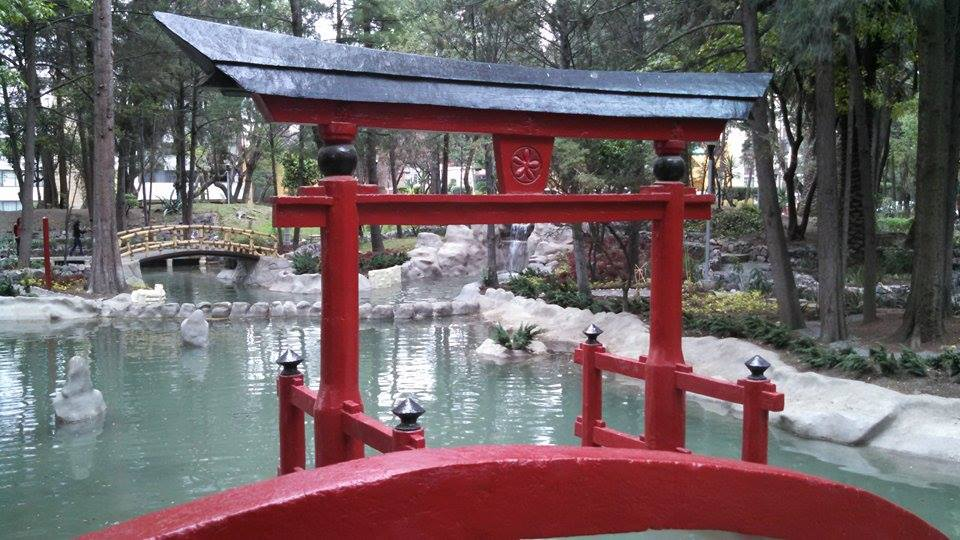
Parque Masayoshi Ohira, 2016

There is a private country club called Club Campestre de Churubusco which contains padel, tennis, a gymnasium, a swimming pool, and a golf course offering 9-hole and 18-hole golf. It was founded in 1905 by a small group of athletic enthusiasts and went through heavy development in the 1960s. Nowadays, many streets along Campestre Churubusco have names such as Cal. Atletas (Athletes), C. Tenis (Tennis), and C. Country Club, among others.

There are two public parks in Churubusco. Parque Xicoténcatl is located across the street from the Museum of Interventions. It features six square kilometres of trees, as well as a statue depicting Hernán Cortés and his wife and son. Parque Masayoshi Ohira is located adjacent to Club Campestre, and features a Japanese-style garden, a stream, a basketball court, and two playgrounds. In the past, there had been a three-storey pagoda, but the structure burned down in the 1970s. Both parks are popular locations for events such as weddings and parties.

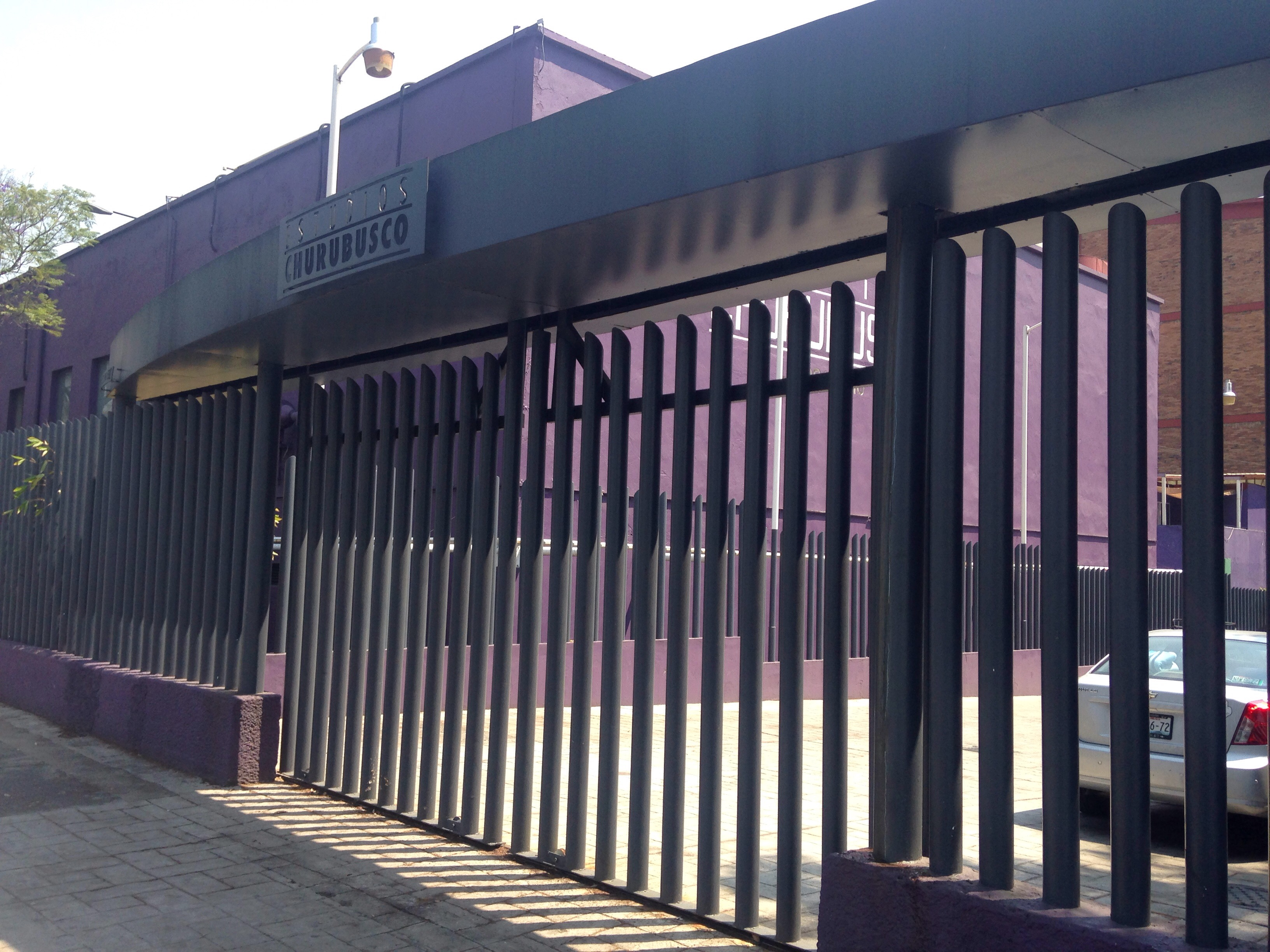
Entrance of Estudios Churubusco

=== Arts and Culture ===
Churubusco is home to the Centro Nacional de las Artes (CENART), which contains ten scenic viewpoints, four theatres, eight art galleries, four libraries, and five art education institutes. It is also home to Estudios Churubusco, which is the first and oldest film production company in Mexico, built in 1943. More than 3,000 films were created with this studio, including major Hollywood blockbuster films such as Titanic (1997 film) and Dune (2021 film).

There are a few museums in Churubusco, including the Museum of the Interventions, as well as the Frida Kahlo Museum as well as the Leon Trotsky House Museum, and the Museo del Ejército y de la Fuerza Aérea.
