= Itzcoatl =

Fourth Tlatoani of Tenochtitlan

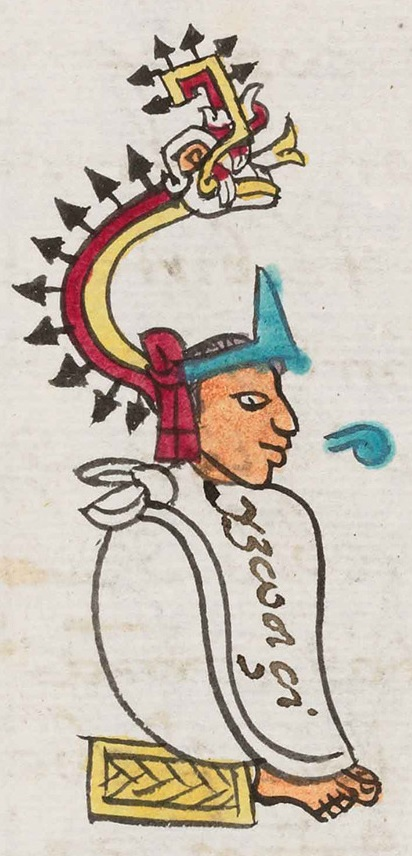
- Itzcoatl in the Codex Mendoza

Tlatoani of Tenochtitlan
- Reign: 1427–1440
- Predecessor: Xihuitl Temoc
- Successor: Moctezuma I
- Born: c. 1380
- Died: 1440 (aged 59–60)
- Spouse: Huacaltzintli
- Issue: Tezozomoc
- Father: Acamapichtli
- Mother: Tepanec woman from Azcapotzalco

Itzcoatl (Classical Nahuatl: Itzcōhuātl [it͡sˈkoːwaːt͡ɬ], "Obsidian Serpent", modern Nahuatl pronunciation) (c. 1380–1440) was the fourth king of Tenochtitlan, and the founder of the Aztec Empire, ruling from 1427 to 1440. Under Itzcoatl, the Mexica of Tenochtitlan broke free from Tepanec domination and established the Triple Alliance (Aztec Empire) with the city-states of Tetzcoco and Tlacopan.

== Biography ==
Itzcoatl was the natural son of tlàtoāni Acamapichtli and an unknown Tepanec woman from Azcapotzalco. He was elected as the king when his predecessor, his nephew Chimalpopoca, was killed by Maxtla of the nearby Tepanec āltepētl (city-state) of Azcapotzalco. Allying with Nezahualcoyotl of Texcoco, Itzcoatl went on to defeat Maxtla and end the Tepanec domination of central Mexico.

After this victory, Itzcoatl, Nezahualcoyotl, and Totoquilhuaztli, king of Tlacopan, forged what would become known as the Aztec Triple Alliance, forming the basis of the eventual Aztec Empire.

Itzcoatl next turned his attention to the chinampas districts on the south shores of Lakes Xochimilco and Chalco. Fresh water springs lining these shores had allowed the development of extensive raised gardens, or chinampas, set on the shallow lake floors. Successful campaigns against Xochimilco (1430), Mixquic (1432), Cuitlahuac (1433), and Tezompa would secure agricultural resources for Tenochtitlan and, along with the conquest of Culhuacan and Coyoacán, would cement the Triple Alliance's control over the southern half of the Valley of Mexico.

With this string of victories, Itzcoatl took In 1439, Itzcoatl undertook a campaign outside the Valley of Mexico against Cuauhnahuac (Cuernavaca).

According to the Florentine Codex, Itzcoatl ordered the burning of all historical codices because it was "not wise that all the people should know the paintings". Among other purposes, this allowed the Aztec state to develop a state-sanctioned official history and mythos that venerated Huitzilopochtli.

Itzcoatl also continued the building of Tenochtitlan: during his reign temples, roads, and a causeway were built. Itzcoatl established the religious and governmental hierarchy that was assumed by his nephew Moctezuma I upon his death in 1440.

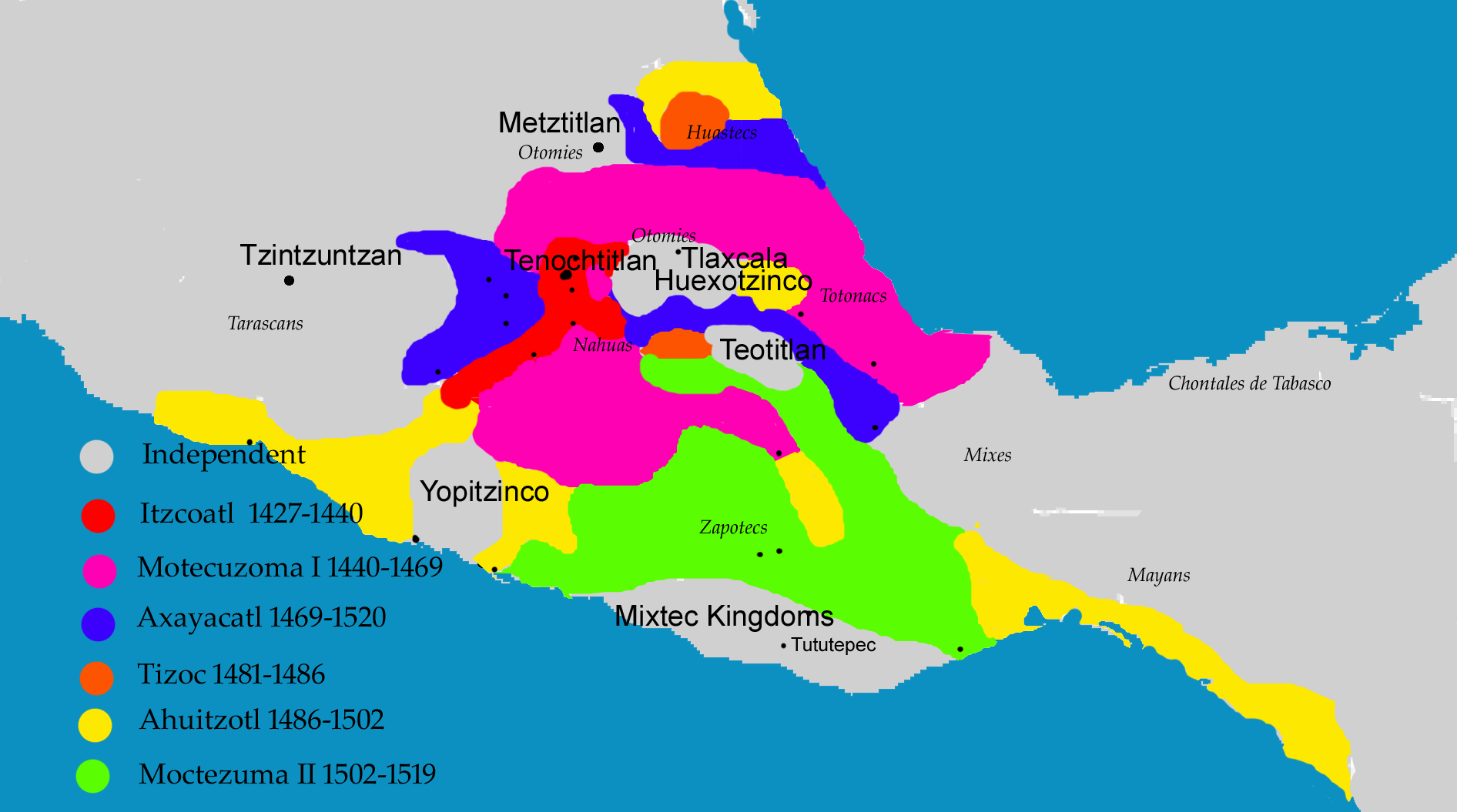
Map showing the expansion of the Aztec empire showing the areas conquered by the Aztec rulers. The conquests of Itzcoatl are marked by the colour red.

== Family ==
Itzcoatl was a son of Acamapichtli and half-brother of Huitzilihuitl. He was an uncle of Chimalpopoca and Moctezuma I.

He married princess Huacaltzintli and had a son Tezozomoc.

== See also ==
- List of Tenochtitlan rulers
- History of the Aztecs

== Notes ==
Preceded by Chimalpopoca	Tlatoani of Tenochtitlan; 1427–1440	Succeeded by Moctezuma I
