= Moctezuma I =

Fifth Tlatoani of Tenochtitlan

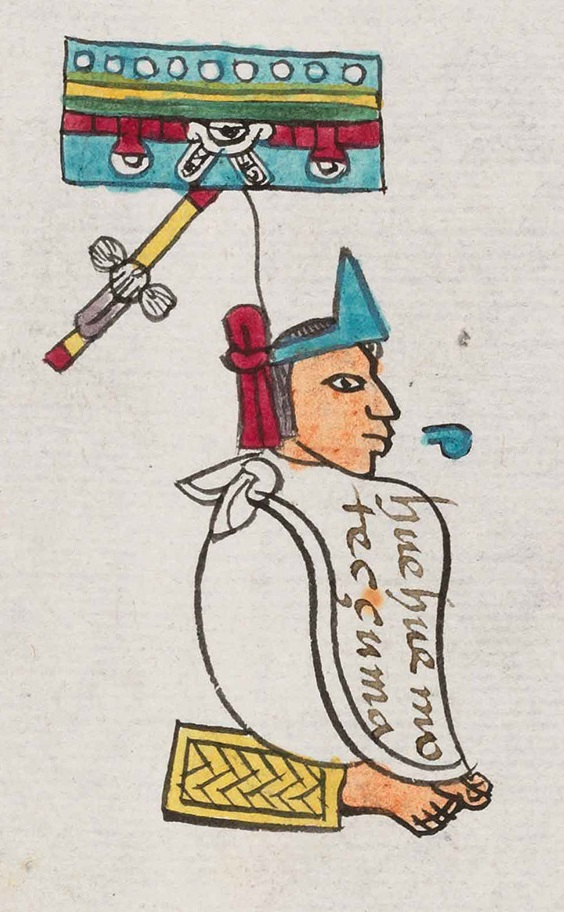
- Moctezuma I in the Codex Mendoza

Tlatoani of Tenochtitlan
- Reign: 1440–1469
- Predecessor: Itzcoatl
- Successor: Atotoztli II
- Born: 1398
- Died: 1469 (aged 70–71)
- Spouse: Queen Chichimecacihuatzin I
- Issue: Princess Atotoztli II; Princess Chichimecacihuatzin II; Prince Iquehuacatzin; Prince Mahchimaleh
- Father: Emperor Huitzilihuitl
- Mother: Queen Miahuaxihuitl

Moctezuma I (c. 1398–1469), also known as Montezuma I, Moteuczomatzin Ilhuicamina (Classical Nahuatl: Motēuczōmah Ilhuicamīna [motɛːkʷˈs̻oːmaḁ ilwikaˈmiːna]) or Huehuemoteuczoma (Huēhuemotēuczōmah [weːwemotɛːkʷˈs̻oːmaḁ]), was the second Aztec emperor and fifth king of Tenochtitlan. During his reign, the Aztec Empire was consolidated, major expansion was undertaken, and Tenochtitlan started becoming the dominant partner of the Aztec Triple Alliance. Often mistaken for his popular descendant, Moctezuma II, Moctezuma I greatly contributed to the famed Aztec Empire that thrived until Spanish arrival. He ruled over a period of peace from 1440 to 1453. Moctezuma brought social, economical, and political reform to strengthen Aztec rule, and Tenochtitlan benefited from relations with other cities.

== Ancestry ==
Moctezuma was the son of emperor Huitzilihuitl (meaning 'Hummingbird Feather') and queen Miahuaxihuitl. He was a brother of Chimalpopoca, Tlacaelel I, and Huehue Zaca. He was the grandson of the first ruler of Tenochtitlan. His name meant "he is angry like a lord" (from the root tēuc- 'lord' combined with the reflexive verb mo/zōma 'becomes angry').

== Accession and coronation ==
After emperor Huitzilihuitl's death, Moctezuma's brother Chimalpopoca ruled for ten years until his assassination. During his reign, Moctezuma and his brother Tlacaelel I led an opposition group of young nobles. This group was militant in nature, and they chose his half-uncle Itzcoatl as the next ruler. Under Itzcoatl, Moctezuma and Tlacaelel were generals in his army.

Moctezuma then was elected to power in 1440 by this group of nobles at the age of 42, after the death of Itzcoatl. He held the title of "Great Speaker." This title was bestowed upon him as opposed to the title of "Speaker," as he spoke for both the Aztecs and the other peoples under their control.

His coronation was a large ceremony, involving many human sacrifices of prisoners. Moctezuma was seated on a basketwork throne and was crowned by the ruler of Texcoco. His crown was a turquoise diadem known as the fire crown.

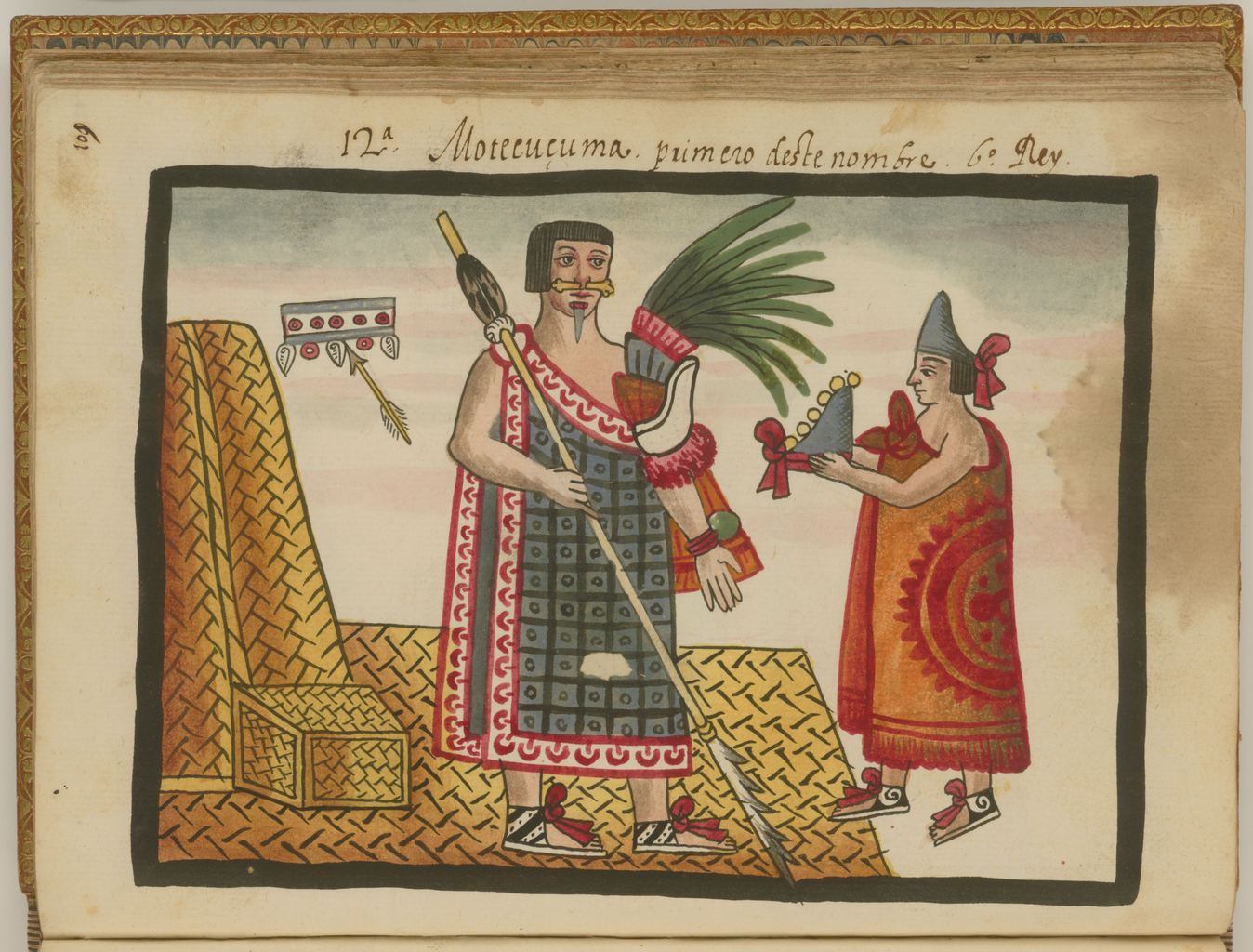
The coronation of Moctezuma I

== Reign ==
As tlatoani, Moctezuma solidified the alliance with two neighboring states, Tlacopan (a small city-state) and Texcoco. Tlacopan, located on the western shore of Lake Texcoco, controlled seven city-states to the northwest, while Texcoco was located on the eastern shore and rule over nine city-states in the northeast. As the two regions were added to Moctezuma's empire, the Aztecs relied on already established city-states to increase military power. In this skillfully crafted Triple Alliance, 2/5ths of the spoils would go to Tenochtitlan and another 2/5ths to Texcoco, with the remaining 1/5 given to Tlacopan.

Among the Aztecs' greatest achievements, Moctezuma and Nezahualcoyotl of Texcoco organized the construction and completion of a double aqueduct pipe system, supplying the city of Tenochtitlan with fresh water. This provided an ample supply of fresh water to Texcoco's various communities, which extended over a distance of 12 kilometres (7.5 mi) from their lakeshore to the hills of Tetxcotxinco.

Early in his rule, he conquered the state of Oaxaca in 1445. Moctezuma then went on to extend the boundaries of the Aztec empire beyond the Valley of México to the Gulf Coast, known as the "Sea of the Sky", for the first time, subjugating the Huastec people and Totonac peoples and thereby gaining access to exotic goods such as cocoa, rubber, cotton, fruits, feathers, and seashells. The Aztec were then known as the "Neighbors of the Sea of the Sky", as they controlled all the territory up to the Gulf of Mexico.

=== Natural disasters ===
As a ruler, Moctezuma faced and overcame many natural disasters. In 1446, a swarm of locusts destroyed the region's crops In 1449, Lake Texcoco flooded the city. In 1450, a frost and drought again destroyed the region's crops. These droughts and frosts continued for four years. The famines resulted in some selling their children or themselves into slavery, and the city lost most of its population. This drought resulted in Moctezuma's period of peace ending.

=== Flower War ===
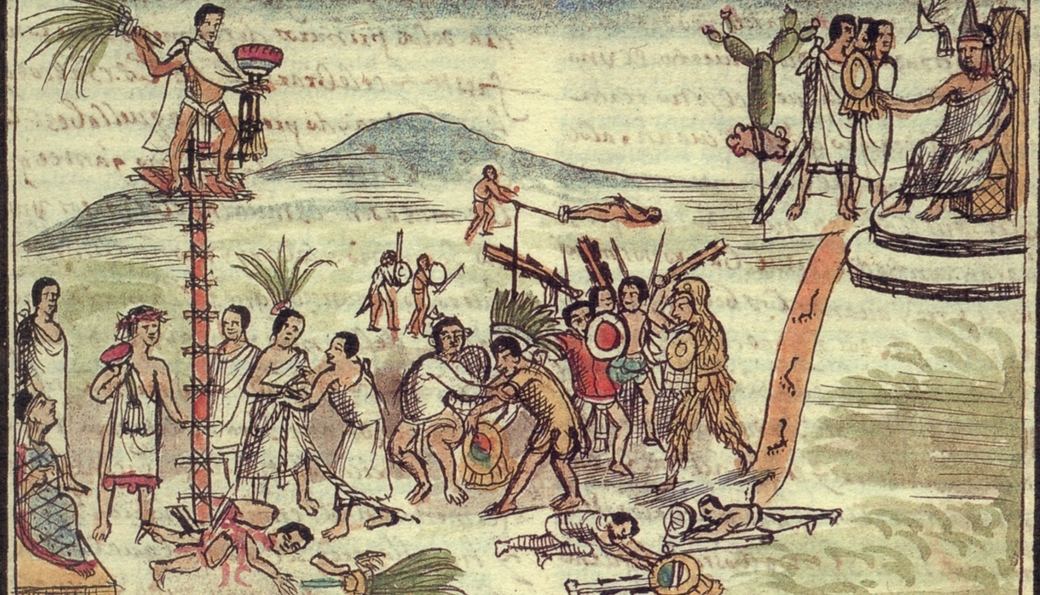
War between Tenochtitlan and Chalco

After the famine ravaged through Aztec agricultural resources, a series of conflicts, known as the Flower War, involved the Triple Alliance and the city-states of Huejotzingo, Tlaxcala, Cholula, in the Tlaxcala-Pueblan Valley of central Mexico. Believing the famine to have occurred due to their gods' anger, Moctezuma supported the order for an increase of human sacrifices to please them. Thus began the war to accumulate as many victims as possible for sacrifice. The war lasted until the Spanish arrived and recruited enemies of the Triple Alliance to conquer all of Mexico. In preparation for the war, Moctezuma would issue three declarations of war and provide weapons to the enemy region. If the last declaration was not accepted by the enemy region, then within 20 days the Aztecs would attack.

=== Expeditions as ruler ===
In the 1450s, Aztec forces under Moctezuma would invade the Valley of Oaxaca in a bid to extend Aztec hegemony. In about 1458, Moctezuma led an expedition into Mixtec territory against the city-state of Coixtlahuaca. The Mixtecs were defeated, despite the support of contingents of Tlaxcala and Huexotzinco warriors, traditional enemies of the Aztecs. While most of the defeated princes were allowed to retain their positions, the Mixtec ruler Atonal was ritually strangled and his family was taken as slaves. The Codex Mendoza records that the tribute owed by Coixtlahuaca consisted of 2000 blankets (of five types), two military outfits with headdresses and shields, green gemstone beads, 800 bunches of green feathers, 40 bags of cochineal dye, and 20 bowls of gold dust. He took many girls from Coixtlahuaca and had ten harems all to himself. He stole three of them from his dead brother Huehue Zaca. Similar campaigns were conducted against Cosamaloapan, Ahuilizapan (Orizaba), and Cuetlachtlan (Cotaxtla).

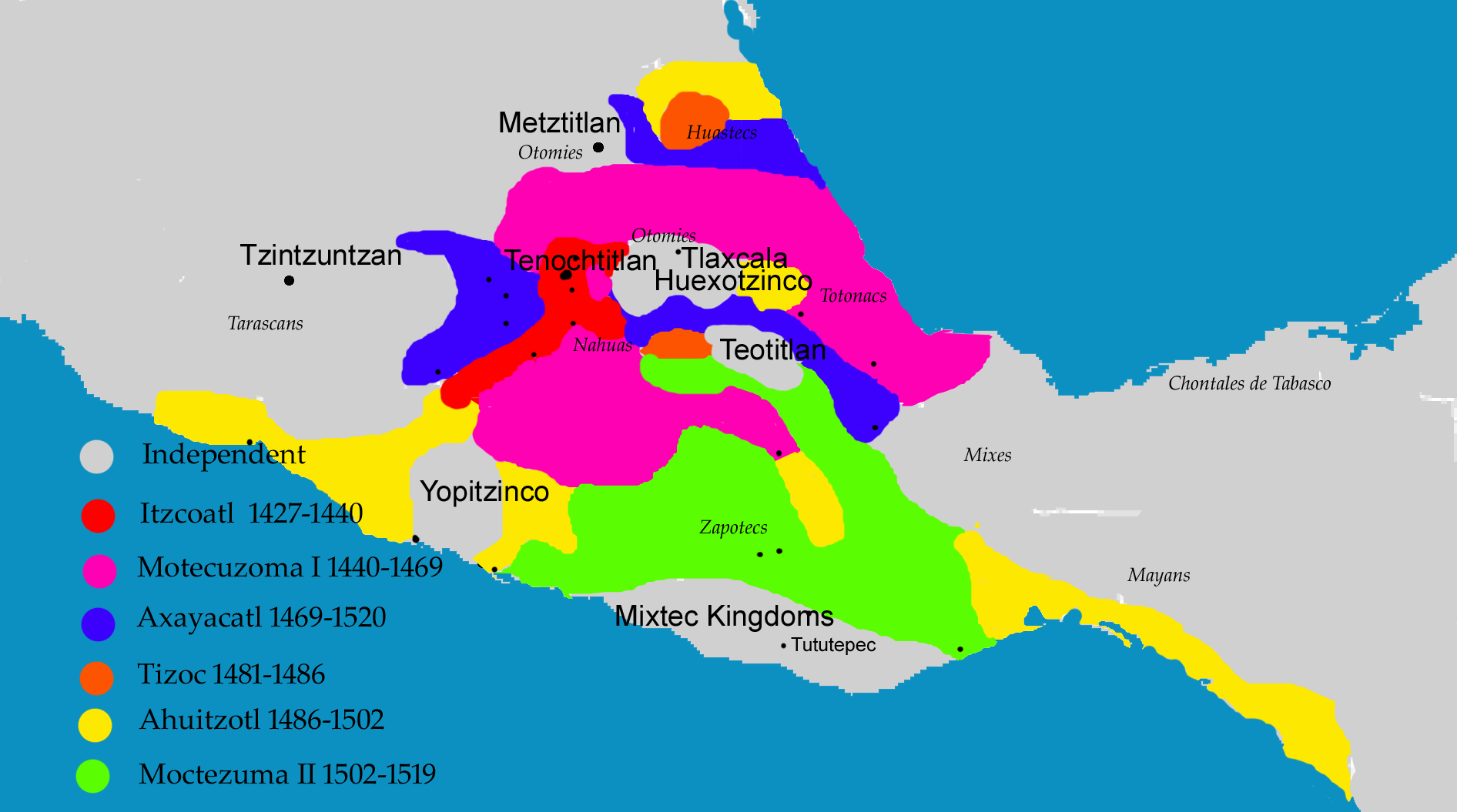
Map showing the expansion of the Aztec empire showing the areas conquered by the Aztec rulers. The conquests of Moctezuma is marked by the colour pink.

=== Opposition to his reign ===
It is reported that Moctezuma's half-brother Tlacaelel opposed his leadership in the early years. However, other historians report that he was once given the opportunity to rule and turned the opportunity down. He took over the empire in 1469 after the death of Moctezuma.

=== Social, political, and economic reforms ===
While Moctezuma did lead conquests against others, he was able to maintain peace from 1440 to 1453 within his empire. With this peace, his government was able to enact social, political, and economic reforms.

He enacted codes which determined what people of certain classes could wear and what their houses could look like. For example, only noblemen or great warriors could have a home with a second story. No one was allowed to have towers, because he claimed they could only be granted by the gods.

He also created legal and education policies that were determined by class. In the palace, different classes were to be received in different rooms. No mixing was allowed under the punishment of death. Only Moctezuma was allowed to give a death sentence, and all judges had to notify him of any death penalty rulings. Religion was also emphasized, and religious schools were required in every neighborhood.

== Descendants and legacy ==
This Moctezuma was an ancestor of Moctezuma II, who met Hernan Cortes.

Moctezuma was succeeded by his daughter Atotoztli, who was either Tlatoani or regent for her son Axayacatl. Moctezuma is also now used as a symbol of Mexican independence and resistance. Moctezuma I is depicted less than Moctezuma II in popular culture, but he has appeared in strategy games such as the Sid Meier's Civilization series and Rise of Kingdoms. His illness and death are depicted in the 1990 Mexican film, Return to Aztlán.

Moctezuma is also seen as a "hero-god" by several Southwestern Native American tribes, especially the Tohono O'odham and Pueblo. His legend is somewhat distinct from the actual historical figure, but shares elements of him and likely originated with tales of the real one. He is a somewhat ambiguous Noah figure, who is subservient to the Great Spirit.

== Archaeological finds ==
In February 2026, archaeologists from the Templo Mayor Project (PTM) in Mexico City announced the discovery of a colossal Mexica offering dating to the reign of Motecuhzoma Ilhuicamina. The discovery involves three newly identified ritual deposits (Offerings 186, 187, and 189) that mirror three others found in previous decades. The chests contained 83 greenstone figurines carved in the Mezcala style. These 1,000-year-old relics were captured as war plunder from the northern highlands of Guerrero following Mexica military conquests and were ritually re-consecrated with facial paint associated with the rain god Tlaloc. The deposits also yielded over 4,000 marine elements, including shells and snails from the Atlantic coast.

== See also ==
- List of people from Morelos
- List of Tenochtitlan rulers
- Oaxtepec

Preceded by Itzcoatl	Tlatoani of Tenochtitlan; 1440–1469	Succeeded by Axayacatl
