= Huitzilopochco =

Pre-Columbian Nahua city-state

- 15th Century–1520s
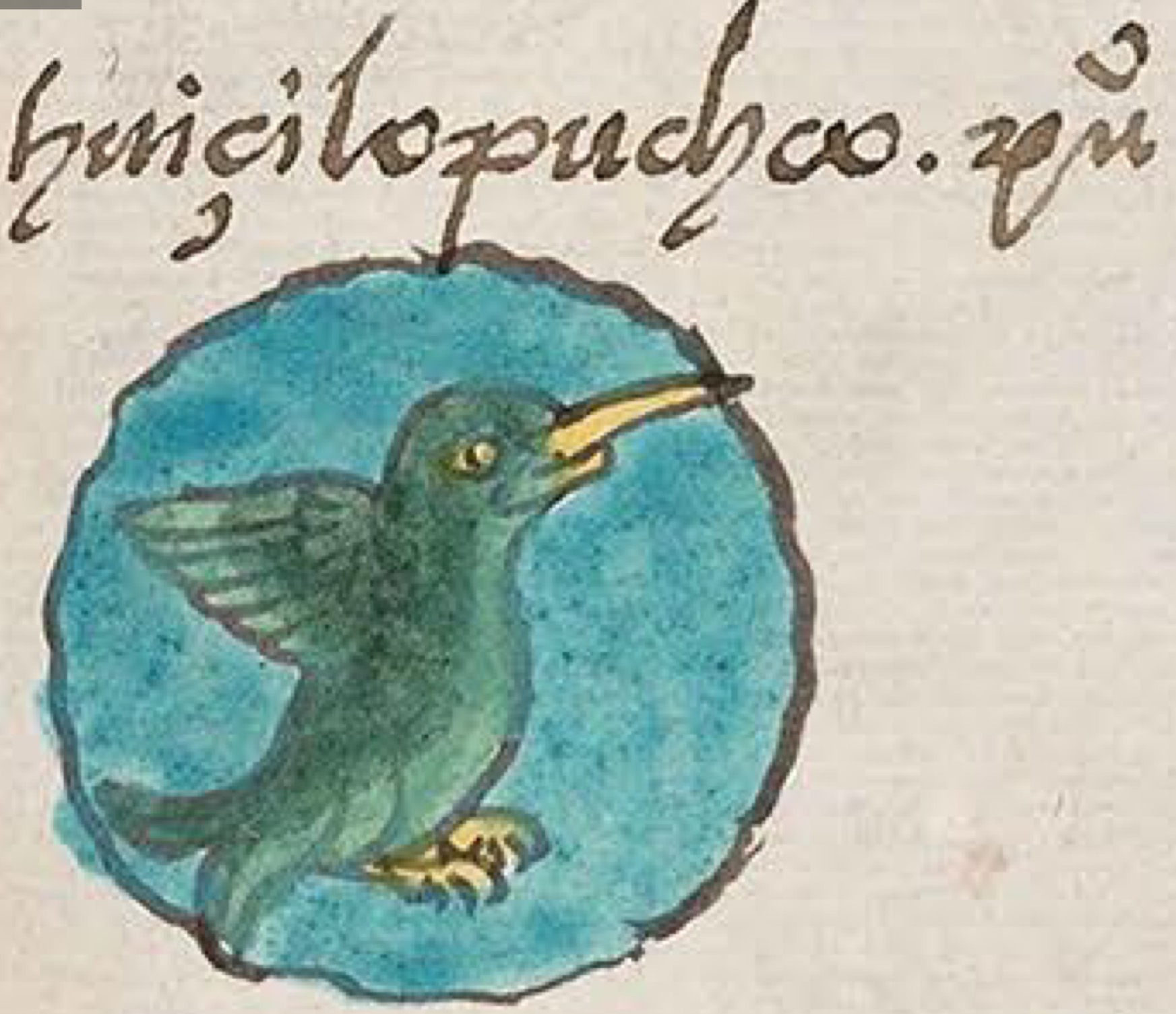
- Glyph
- Common languages: Nahuatl
- Religion: Pre-Columbian Nahua religion
- Government: Monarchy
- Historical era: Pre-Columbian
  - Established: 15th Century
  - Incorporated into New Spain: 1520s
Succeeded by
Viceroyalty of New Spain

Huitzilopochco (sometimes called Churubusco, and other variants) was a small pre-Columbian Nahua altepetl (city-state) in the Valley of Mexico, located adjacent to Coyoacán. Huitzilopochco was called one of the Nauhtecuhtli ("Four Lords"), alongside Culhuacan, Itztapalapan and Mexicatzinco. The name Huitzilopochco means "place of Huitzilopochtli (a god)" in Nahuatl. The inhabitants of Huitzilopochco were known as Huitzilopochca. Huitzilopochco was either conquered or entered into an alliance with Tenochtitlan in 1428.
