= Chimalpopoca =

Third Tlatoani of Tenochtitlan

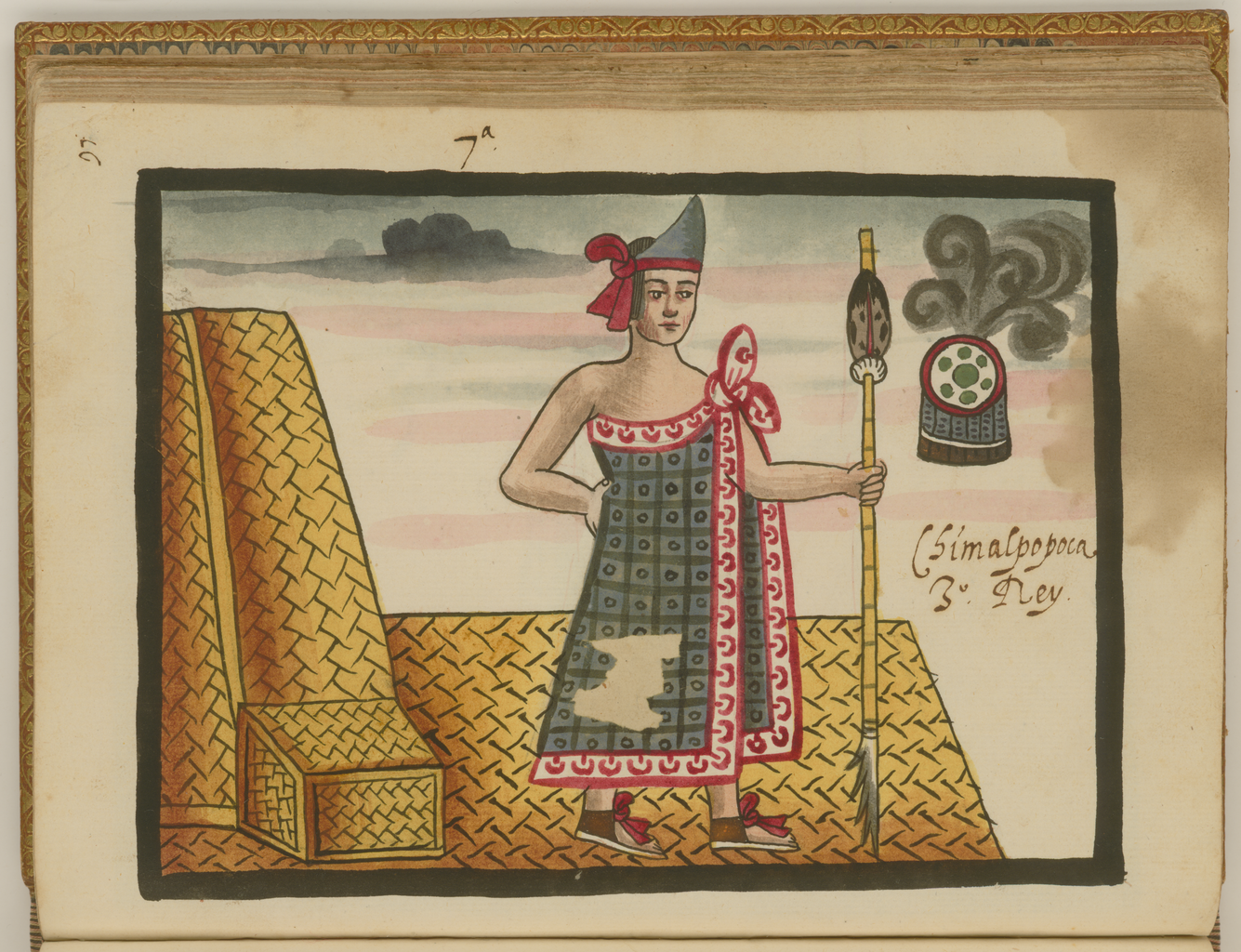
- Chimalpopoca as depicted in the Tovar Codex.

Tlatoani of Tenochtitlan
- Predecessor: Huitzilihuitl
- Successor: Xihuitl Temoc; Itzcoatl
- Born: 1397
- Died: 1427 (aged 29–30)
- Spouse: Queen Matlalatzin
- Issue: Tezozomoc
- Father: Emperor Huitzilihuitl
- Mother: Empress Ayauhcihuatl

Chimalpopoca (Classical Nahuatl: Chīmalpopōca [t͡ʃiːmaɬpoˈpoːka] for "smoking shield," modern Nahuatl pronunciation) or Chīmalpopōcatzin (1397–1427) was the third Emperor of Tenochtitlan (1417–1427).

== Biography ==
Chimalpopoca was born to the Emperor Huitzilihuitl and Queen Ayauhcihuatl.

=== Rule ===
Chimalpopoca was crowned in 1417 (some sources say 1416 or 1418), at approximately 20 years old. At that time, Tenochtitlan was a tributary of the Tepanec city of Azcapotzalco, which was ruled by his grandfather Tezozomoc. This alliance, and the Mexicas' position within it, was strengthened by Tenochtitlan's loyalty during Tezozomoc's 1418 war with Ixtlilxochitl I of Texcoco. The conquered city was granted to Tenochtitlan as a tributary.

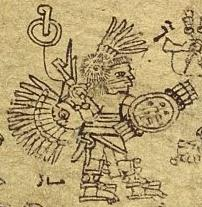
Chimalpopoca impersonating the god Huitzilopochtli.

Nezahualcoyotl, displaced prince of Texcoco, was living in the mountains. Chimalpopoca interceded with Tezozomoc on his behalf, and Tezozomoc agreed to allow Netzahualcoyotl to live in Tenochtitlan under his protection.

In 1426 Tezozómoc assisted Chimalpopoca in the construction of a new aqueduct. This aqueduct was of wood, and ran from the elevated place of Chapultepec to Tenochtitlan.

Chimalpopoca also had a causeway constructed to Tlacopan. The causeway contained openings spanned by wooden bridges, which were removed at night.

Also during his reign he dedicated a stone for sacrifices in the Tlacocomoco section of Tenochtitlan. The conquest of Tequizquiac is also attributed to him.

== Family ==
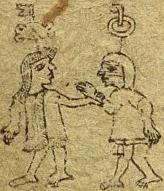
Chimalpopoca (right) captured by the Tepanecs

Chimalpopoca was the son of Huitzilihuitl, the previous ruler, but there are some sources that say he was a son of Acamapichtli, the first ruler of Tenochtitlan, making him Huitzilihuitl's brother. Gerónimo de Mendieta, in his Historia eclesiástica indiana, notes the discrepancy and concludes that Huitzilihuitl, Chimalpopoca and Itzcoatl (Chimalpopoca's successor) must have been brothers, based on his understanding of the Aztec system of succession.

He had many wives and children. One of the wives was his cousin Matlalatzin. His son was Tezozomoc, king of Ecatepec.

Three versions of the family tree of the first Aztec rulers:

Acamapichtli
Huitzilihuitl	Itzcoatl	Huitzilihuitl	Acamapichtli
Chimalpopoca	Chimalpopoca	Itzcoatl	Huitzilihuitl	Chimalpopoca	Itzcoatl

Chimalpopoca was a grandson of Acamapichtli and Tezozomoc and half-brother of Moctezuma I.

== Death ==
When Tezozomoc died in 1426 after a long reign, he was succeeded by his son Tayauh (also known as Tayatzin). However Maxtla, ruler of Coyoacan and brother of Tayauh, usurped the throne. Chimalpopoca allied with Tayauh, and so Maxtla had Chimalpopoca killed, though the details remain unclear. Maxtla also raised the tribute required from Tenochtitlan as further punishment for Chimalpopoca's actions.

Maxtla subsequently named their brother, Itzcoatl, the tlatoani of the region. However, Itzcoatl quickly allied himself with Nezahualcoyotl of Texcoco and Totoquihuatzin of Tlacopan, and they collectively took down Maxtla, who had remained the Tepanec king.

== See also ==
- List of Tenochtitlan rulers

== Notes ==
Regnal titles
Preceded by Huitzilihuitl	Tlatoani of Tenochtitlan; 1417–1427	Succeeded by Itzcoatl
