= Huitzilihuitl =

Second Tlatoani of Tenochtitlan

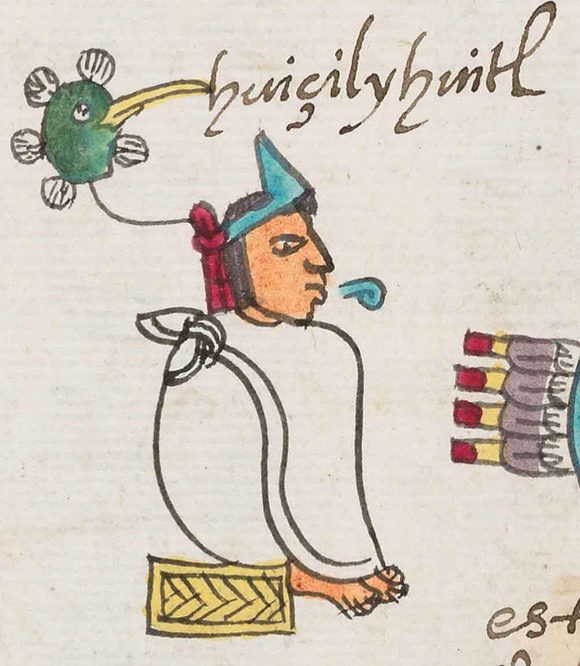
- Depiction in the Codex Mendoza, c. 1541

Tlatoani of Tenochtitlan
- Reign: 1390–1415, 1396–1417 or 1403–1417
- Coronation: Five Snake / 22 January
- Predecessor: Acamapichtli
- Successor: Chimalpopoca
- Born: c. 1379; Mexico Tenochtitlan
- Died: 1415 or 1417
- Wives: Empress Ayauhcihuatl; Empress Cacamacihuatl Empress Miahuaxihuitl Empress Miyahuaxochtzin
- Issue: Chimalpopoca; Tlacaelel I Moctezuma I Huehue Zaca; Citlalcoatl; Aztacoatl; Axicyotzin; Quauhtzitzimitzin; Xiconoc; Teotlatlauhqui; Cuitlahuatzin; Miccayaocihuatl; Matlalchihuatzin
- Father: Emperor Acamapichtli
- Mother: Empress Tezcatlan Miyahuatzin

Huitzilihuitl (Nahuatl pronunciation: [wit͡siˈliwit͡ɬ]) or Huitzilihuitzin (Nahuatl language; English: Hummingbird Feather) (1370s – ca. 1417) was the second Tlatoani or king of Tenochtitlan. According to the Codex Chimalpahin, he reigned from 1390 to 1415, according to the Codex Aubin, he reigned from 1396 to 1417 and according to the Codex Chimalpopoca, he reigned from 1403 to 1417.

== Biography ==
=== Family and childhood ===
Huitzilíhuitl was born in Tenochtitlan, and was the son of Acamapichtli, first tlatoani of the Mexica, and Queen Tezcatlan Miyahuatzin, and had a half-brother Itzcoatl. His maternal grandfather was Acacitli. Only 16 years old when his father died, Huitzilihuitl was elected by the principal chiefs, warriors and priests of the city to replace him. At that time, the Mexica were tributaries of the Tepanec city-state of Azcapotzalco.

=== Reign ===
Huitzilíhuitl, a good politician, continued the policies of his father, seeking alliances with his neighbors. He founded the Royal Council or Tlatocan and established four permanent electors to advise the new king, in his inexperience, at the beginning of each reign.

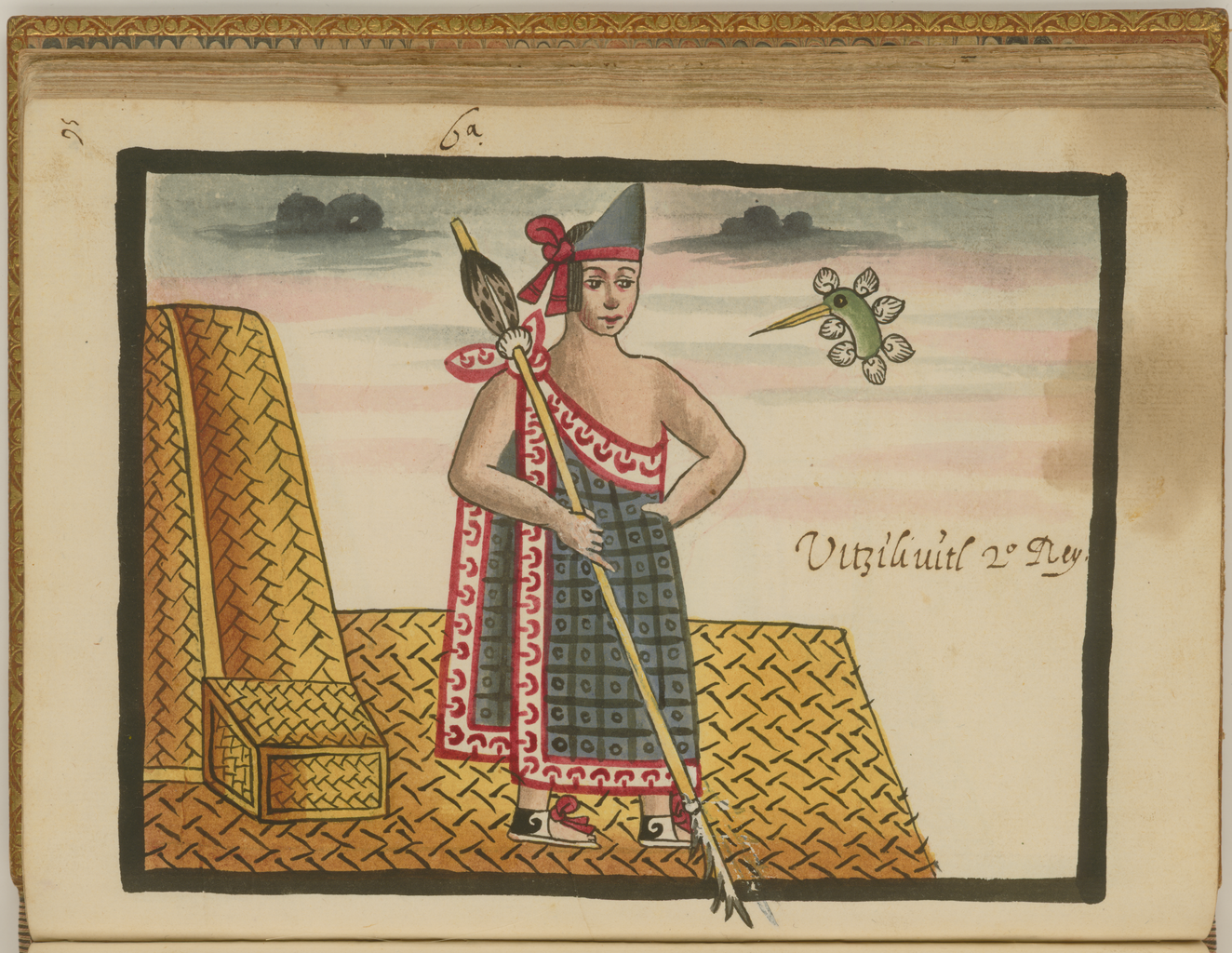
Huitzilihuitl as depicted in the Tovar Codex.

He married Ayauhcihuatl, daughter of Tezozómoc, the powerful tlatoani of Azcapotzalco, and obtained a reduction of tribute payments to the symbolic level. Their son Chimalpopoca would succeed his father as tlatoani. After the death of Ayaucíhuatl, Huitzilíhuitl married a second time, to Miahuaxihuitl. They had a son, Moctezuma I, who also succeeded to the throne as the fifth Huey Tlatoani of Aztecs.

During his reign, the weaving industry grew. It provided cotton cloth not only for Tenochtitlan, but also for Azcapotzalco and Cuauhnāhuac. The Mexicas no longer had to dress in coarse ayates of maguey fibers, but were able to change to soft, dyed cotton.

Huitzilíhuitl also wanted to introduce potable water into the city, bringing it to the island from the mainland over the brackish water of the lake. But the nobles not approving the cost, he was unable to put his plan into operation. He constructed a fort on a rock on the island.

In 1409, the ruler of Texcoco, Techotlala, died and the throne passed to Ixtlilxóchitl I. In the following years, relations between Ixtlilxóchitl and Tezozómoc of Azcapotzalco deteriorated, breaking into open hostilities c. 1416.

In spite of having given his daughter Matlalchihuatzin in marriage to Ixtlilxóchitl, Huitzilíhuitl joined his father-in-law in making war on Texcoco. He assisted in the conquest and sacking of the cities of Tultitlan, Cuauhtitlan, Chalco, Tollantzingo, Xaltocan, Otompa and Acolman. Huitzilíhuitl profited from the booty of these conquests and also from the traffic of the canoes on the lakes surrounding Tenochtitlan.

=== Death ===
Huitzilíhuitl died, probably in 1417, before the end of the war between Azcapotzalco and Texcoco. His successor, his son Chimalpopoca, continued to support Tezozómoc and Azcapotzalco.

== Personal life ==
Among his wives were Queen Ayauhcihuatl, Queen Cacamacihuatl, Queen Miahuaxihuitl, and Queen Miyahuaxochtzin.

== See also ==
- List of Tenochtitlan rulers

== Notes ==
Regnal titles
Preceded by Acamapichtli	Tlatoani of Tenochtitlan; 1396–1417	Succeeded by Chimalpopoca
