= List of archaeological sites in Chihuahua, Mexico =

This is a list of archaeological sites in Chihuahua, Mexico.

== Locations ==
| Site name | Culture | Nearest town (modern name) | Location | Type | Description | Photo |
|---|---|---|---|---|---|---|
| Bocoyna | Tarahumara | Bocoyna | | | Ruins | |
| Cerro Juanaqueña | Hohokam | | Trincheras | Ruins | | |
| Cuarenta Casas | Mogollon culture | Vallecito | | | Ruins. Located at Cuarenta Casas. | |
| Cueva del Puente | Mogollon culture | Vallecito | | | Ruins. Located at Cuarenta Casas. | |
| Cueva de la Serpiente | Mogollon culture | Vallecito | | | Ruins, located at Cuarenta Casas. | |
| Cueva Grande | Mogollon culture | Vallecito | | | Ruins. Located at Cuarenta Casas. | |
| Cueva del Puente | Mogollon culture | Madera | | | Ruins. Located at Cuarenta Casas. | |
| Cueva de las Monas | Tarahumara | Chihuahua Municipality | | | Rock art cave | |
| Cueva de las Ventanas | Mogollon culture | Vallecito | | | Ruins. Located at Cuarenta Casas. | |
| Cueva de la Momia | | Ciudad Madera | | | Ruins. | |
| Cueva de la Olla | | Nuevo Casas Grandes | | | Ruins | |
| Cueva de la Ranchería | | Ciudad Madera | | | Ruins | |
| House of the Ovens | Mogollon culture | Janos | | | Ruins located at Casas Grandes that is part of a World Heritage Site. A single-story room and four kivas. It forms part of a larger complex consisting of nine rooms and two small plazas. | |
| House of the Serpent | Mogollon culture | Janos | | | Ruins located at Casas Grandes that is part of a World Heritage Site. Originally consisted of 26 rooms and three plazas. | |
| Cuarenta Casas | Mogollon culture | Vallecito | | | Ruins | |
| Complejo Huapoca | Mogollon culture | Cuarenta Casas | | | Ruins | |
| Cueva de la Olla | Mogollon culture | Cuarenta Casas | | | Ruins. | |
| Cueva Grande | Mogollon culture | Cuarenta Casas | | | Ruins | |
| Cueva de las Jarillas | Mogollon culture | Cuarenta Casas | | | Ruins | |
| Huápoca | Mogollon culture | Ciudad Madera | | | Ruins | |
| House of the Macaws | Mogollon culture | Janos | | | Ruins located at Casas Grandes that is part of a World Heritage Site. This site is so named because 122 birds were buried beneath its floors. | |
| House of the Wells | Mogollon culture | Janos | | | Ruins located at Casas Grandes that is part of a World Heritage Site. The large storage cistern in one of its plazas that was fed from the common network. | |
| Nido del Aguila | Mogollon culture | Vallecito | | | Ruins, located at Cuarenta Casas. | |
| Paquimé / Casas Grandes | Mogollon culture | Janos | | | Ruins. Located at Casas Grandes, this is a World Heritage Site. | |
| La Ranchería | Mogollon culture | Madera | | | Ruins. Located at Cuarenta Casas. | |

== See also ==
- History of Chihuahua
