= Cueva de la Momia =

Archaeological site in Chihuahua, Mexico

- Interactive map of Cueva de la Momia
- 28°59′40.38″N 108°12′31.75″W
- Type: Archaeological site
- Cultures: Mogollon - Paquimé
- Location: Ciudad Madera, Chihuahua, Mexico

Cueva de la Momia is an archaeological site located in the region of Ciudad Madera, in the Sirupa Canyon region, in the northwest of the Mexican state of Chihuahua. It is located at the foot of a very high cliff on the ravine of the Arroyo del Venado, shortly before it joins the Rio Chico; in the vicinity of the Huápoca Canyon, is a series of caves where a number of mummies were found.

The site is in the Huápoca ravines in the Sierra Tarahumara, home of the Tarahumara or Rarámuri. The mummified body of an adult person, possibly female, was discovered well preserved in situ with details such as skin, hair, nails, and even some teeth.

The site received its name because it was said to contain several mummies. Following destruction by vandals, one mummy was preserved. The cave has two levels; some archaeological remains can be seen. The top level was a housing complex.

The mummy rests in a special museum next to the "Real del Bosque" motel on the outskirts of Ciudad Madera, which was purpose-built by Captain Leal, owner of the motel.

== First Investigations ==
In 1898, Norwegian explorer Carl Sofus Lumholtz first described caves in the Madera region, in the north of Sierra Tarahumara. He described several sites, among them Cueva del Garabato, now known as Cuarenta Casas.

Subsequently, several anthropologists and archaeologists briefly explored the region, focusing especially on the outskirts of Cuarenta Casas. Many published the results of their studies:

- Henry A. Carey in 1931
- Edwin Booth "Ted" Sayles in 1936
- Alfred V. Kidder in 1939
- Robert H. Lister in 1946 & 1958
- Eduardo Contreras in 1959
- Arturo Guevara in 1986
- David Pearson, Fernando Sánchez M. and D, Phillips in 1990

Little is known about the caves since exploration and systematic study only started recently.

== The Madera Zone ==
Madera was a sawmill that worked lumber extracted in the forests nearby; its greatest attractions are the ancient caves around the region, which served as shelter for inhabitants of the Paquimé Culture, who built their homes within them.

There are several Paquimé Culture archaeological zones in the area of Madera municipality. The most important caves are:

=== Huápoca ===
Located 36 miles west of Madera, on a dirt road.

The Huápoca caves consist of the "Serpiente" and the Nido de Aguila caves. These are considered the most impressive on a cliff. It has complete structures.

They have excellent views of the Huápoca Canyon.

==== Cueva de la Serpiente ====
It has 14 adobe houses, over 1,000 years old.

==== Nido del águila ====
It only has one house, built on the edge of a sheer cliff under a rocky overhang, provides a meaning to its name (eagle nest).

=== Cueva Grande ===
Located 66 kilometers west of Madera, on a dirt road, Cueva Grande is hidden within convoluted land and behind branches of trees. The mouth of the cave is obscured by a waterfall from the top of the cave to a stream. There are two, double-story houses (800 years old) that are good examples of the native construction techniques. There is also a round grain storage area behind the structure.

=== La Ranchería ===
Cueva de la Ranchería is a cave complex, 50 kilometers south of Madera. It has an extended archaeological area at the base of the Sirupa canyon.

=== Cueva del Puente ===
45 kilómeters north of Madera.

=== Cuarenta Casas ===
Cuevas El Garabato or Cueva de Las Ventanas, known as Cuarenta Casas, was a residential complex of the Paquimé Culture built between 1060 and 1205 CE.

This complex (located in the Garabato Creek) has a number of buildings and a large cave, which is obscured by a small waterfall.

=== New Discoveries ===
In one of the Rio Papigochi side canyons, southwest of Madera, is a complex that was inhabited by ancient communities that built homes in the caves and rock shelters. These sites are so safe that to date they are virtually intact.

None of these caves can be easily seen; the only way to know they are there is when you are inside.

==== Cueva de los Fierros ====
Cueva de los Fierros is located in the middle of the canyon slope in an almost vertical wall. Its size is about 30 m and has a complex of at least 10 adobe rooms, some of them in two floors. The whole has a foundation base, as a terrace, on which the rooms were built, the windows are "T" shape, typical Paquimé Culture.

Almost all rooms are partially destroyed; ceilings still preserve the original wooden structure. Inside were found some stone tools such as scrapers, knives, grindstones, fragments of pottery and other objects which could not be identified. There were many olotes found, evidence of corn consumption and storage.

==== Cueva de la Puerta ====
Cueva de la Puerta is located a few hundred meters from the first cave, also found in the middle of the canyon wall. It measures around 25 m and presents vestiges of approximately 12 rooms or enclosures. Vandals or treasure hunters have partially destroyed the floors and walls.

It can be appreciated how ancient houses were built. For construction they used a kind of braided rods and branches of local trees, mainly tascar (local species of Juniper) and Fraxinus, over the braids they shaped the adobe walls. The braid is well preserved, still has the fiber used to fasten them. There are two types of fastening; one made with "palmilla" fiber (a species of Century Plant or agave and the other with a tree branch called "sawarique". In one of the rooms, the original floor can be seen, made from adobe so well and smooth finished that it looks like cement. Roof and walls of rooms are black, probably by the accumulation of soot and smoke from fires that through hundreds of years were lit there. There is another cave in the opposite side of the canyon, is smaller with only three rooms, but very well preserved.

Half a kilometer above is a small cave with an isolated small house in very good condition. With an excellent view of the canyon, probably this place was an observation or surveillance point.

== The Cultures ==
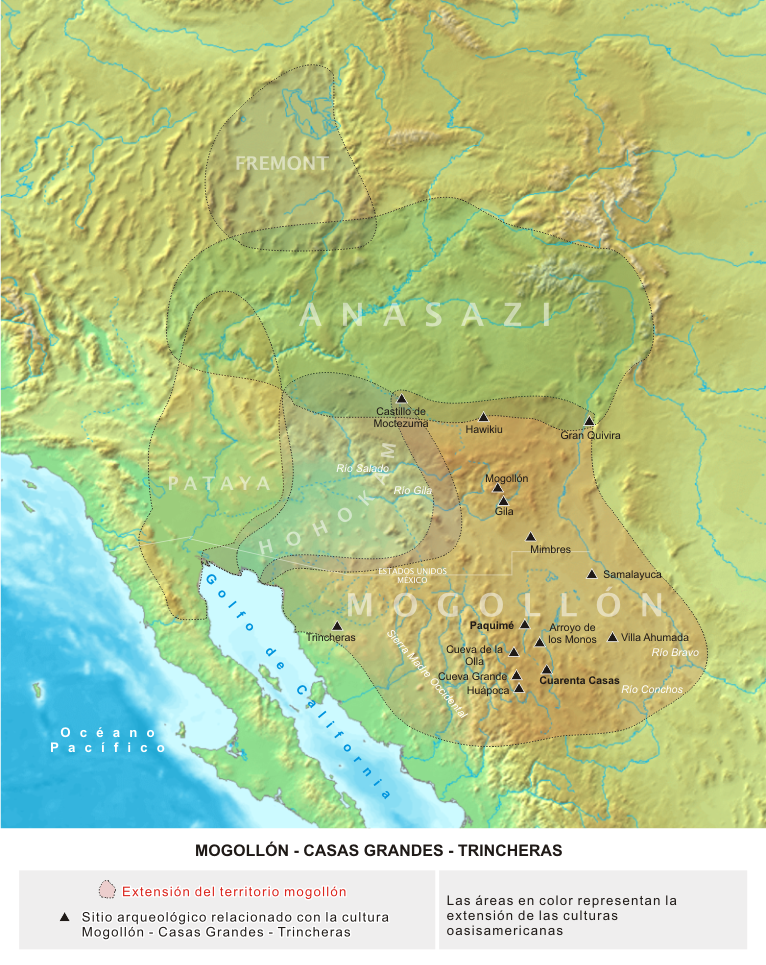
Mogollon and Paquimé Culture Extension

Hunter-gatherers arrived in the region from the north, probably Mogollon, Anasazi or Hohokam, following the Sierra Madre Occidental. They used local plants and took advantage of smaller animal species, such as turkeys. They occupied the mountains and gradually dispersed along rivers, developing the Paquimé Culture or "Casas Grandes", whose first settlers were collectors in the process of learning sedentary traits. All of these major centers are aligned on the 108 degree Longitudinal axis.

Evidence of Mogollon culture (/mʌɡɪˈjoʊn/ or /moʊɡəˈjoʊn/) has been found, such as simple ceramic fragments and other more scarce luxury type materials, characteristic of the Paquimé Culture. The site constructors probably were villagers who in addition to intensively exploit the environment, as can be seen in the premises vestiges, cultivated corn, squash, and beans, therefore they established a community use system.

Important evidence exists of northern Mexico settlers, of the Casas Grandes culture, sub-region of the Mogollon culture, that along with the Anasazi and the Hohokam comprise the Oasisamerica area. The northern cultural region is known in Mexico as "Gran Chichimeca" and in United States is called American Southwest.

Sites of Paquimé Culture are located in the State of Chihuahua; Paquimé was the head and commercial center of the region. The first settlements in this Culture are dated 1000 BCE, since the late archaic); its apogee occurred between 1261 and 1300 CE, and disappeared in 1450 CE.

The difficult nature of this area shaped the distinctive traits of its inhabitants; who developed from nomadic hunter-gatherers to sedentary, farmed the land and animals.

Sites of the Paquimé Culture are found from the Pacific Ocean coast to the Sierra Madre Occidental, passing through many ecological and climate environments.

== El Sitio ==
The cave lies at the foot of a vertical cliff and from the entrance has an excellent view. The cave has two levels, in both are numerous archaeological remains. On the upper level there are more than 10 very well preserved adobe rooms. The first level is only a rocky shelter; to reach the second level, a makeshift ladder is used, then follow up a ramp between stones to the second level. This room has a wide window from which a beautiful view of the canyon is seen. The cave is not very wide, but it is an excellent shelter. At the precipice edge, next to the window, are the remains of an old adobe room. The partly buried mummy was found on the floor of this room.

At the entrance of another adobe house, are remains of another mummy, badly damaged by vandals. It contained much of the remains and tissue and the petate bedroll used to wrap the burial. Researchers from the Ciudad Juárez Autonomous University have informed the Instituto Nacional de Antropología e Historia.

=== Rooms ===
In both levels are archeological remains on both sides.

At the top level, is a complex of small houses made of mud and grass that had been built in the shelter of the cave.

These valuable remains of the Paquimé Culture are at serious risk, given that antiques buyers are eager to get these pieces.

=== The mummy ===
The mummified body of an adult individual was found, surrounded by offerings such as ceramics, stone utensils, stems and corn cobs.

This mummy was found some time ago by vandals or treasure hunters, who fortunately abandoned it on the floor of the room at one end, while they dug at the opposite end.

They destroyed everything they encountered, including some other mummies found in place, leaving scattered useless fragments. Beautifully Paquimé style vases decorated with geometric motifs were broken in their search. Also destroyed were vestiges of bonfires and food remains which would have been evidence of the native way of life.

== See also ==
- Ciudad Madera, Chihuahua
- Mogollon culture
- Oasisamerica
- Cuarenta Casas
- Cueva de la Olla (archaeological site)
- Cueva de la Ranchería
