= Huápoca =

Archaeological site in Chihuahua, Mexico

Huápoca Complex
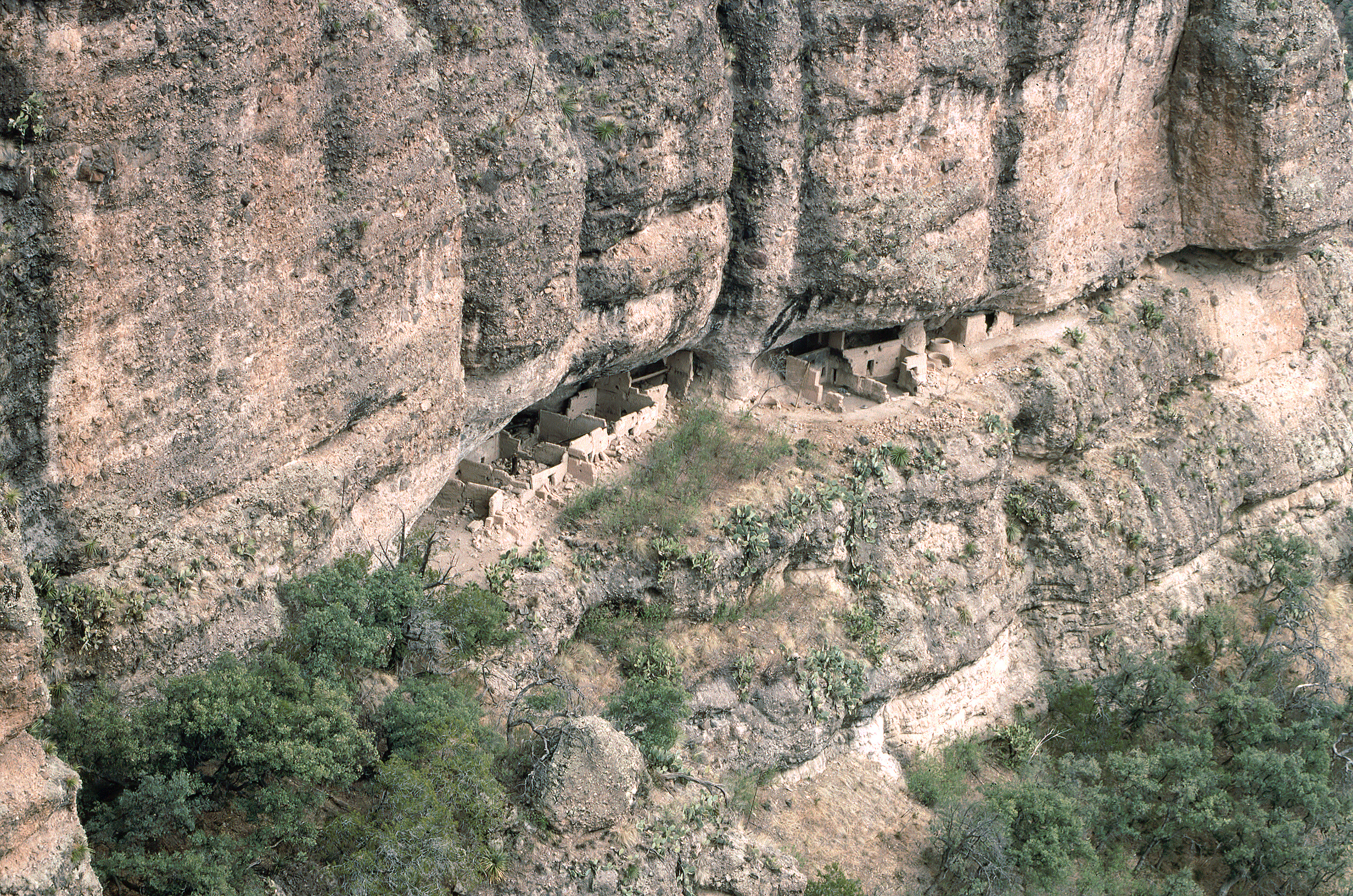
- Huápoca Complex archaeological site
- Interactive map of Huápoca Complex
- 29°11′21″N 108°20′35″W
- Type: Archaeology
- Cultures: Mogollon - Paquimé
- Location: Ciudad Madera, Chihuahua
- Region: Mesoamerica, Oasisamerica, (Mexico)

Huápoca is an archaeological site located 36 kilometers West of Ciudad Madera in the Huápoca Canyon region, which is Northwest of the Mexican state of Chihuahua.

The Huápoca region's notable geographic features with access to the archaeological sites include the Rio Papigochi, the Aguila and Serpiente caves, the Huápoca Spa, and the Huápoca bridge.

There are approximately 150 archaeological sites scattered across the cliffs of the Madera region. Most of them are in varying states of repair, with some damage caused by several factors, including lack of attention, care, and surveillance. Adobe floors are broken in several places and walls, even those with old glyphs, are damaged with graffiti.

== First regional investigations ==
In 1898, Norwegian explorer Darl Lumholtz provided first information about caves in the Madera region in the North of Sierra Tarahumara. Lumholtz discovered several sites, among them Cueva del Garabato (now known as Cuarenta Casas).

Subsequently, several anthropologists and archaeologists briefly explored the region, focusing especially on the outskirts of Cuarenta Casas. Although almost all of them published the results of their studies,little is known about the caves as exploration and systematic study are still not extensive.

Explorers of the region included H.A. Carey in 1931, E.B. Sayles in 1936, A.V. Kidder in 1939, R.H. Lister in 1946 and 1958, Eduardo Contreras in 1959, Arturo Guevara in 1986, and David Pearson, Fernando Sánchez M. and D. Phillips in 1990.

== Madera Zone ==
Madera was a sawmill that processed lumber extracted from the forests nearby. Its greatest attractions are the ancient caves around the region, which served as rooms and shelters for inhabitants of the Paquimé culture. There are several Paquimé archaeological zones in the area of the Madera municipality. The most important caves are:

=== Cueva Grande ===
Located 66 kilometers west of Madera, Cueva Grande hides a waterfall which flows from the top of the cave to a stream. There are two double-story houses (800 years old) that serve as prime examples of the native construction techniques. There is also a round grain storage area behind the structure.

=== La Ranchería ===
La Cueva La Ranchería was a residential complex. Larger than Cuarenta Casas, it is 50 meters long by 20 meters wide. There are also granaries (Cuexcomate) - somewhat damaged - made from adobe and straw, wherein maize was stored.

=== Cueva del Puente ===
Located 45 kilometers north of Madera.

=== Cuarenta Casas ===
Cuevas El Garabato or Cueva de Las Ventanas, also known as Cuarenta Casas, was built between 1060 and 1205 CE. It was a residential complex of the Paquimé culture inhabitants.

This complex (located in the Garabato Creek) has a large quantity of constructions as well as a large cave, guarded by a small waterfall.

=== Cueva de la Momia ===
The mummified body of an adult male, surrounded by offerings such as ceramics, stone utensils, stems, and tender corn cobs (olotes), was found inside the cave. The mummy is now in the Capitan Leal Museum in Ciudad Madera. Its conservation condition is excellent.

It is believed that the cave, located very near the Barranca Arroyo del Venado, had more mummies in good condition, but had been destroyed by irresponsible visitors. The cave is divided into two levels, and the second level has more than ten rooms in optimal conditions.

=== Cueva de las Jarillas ===
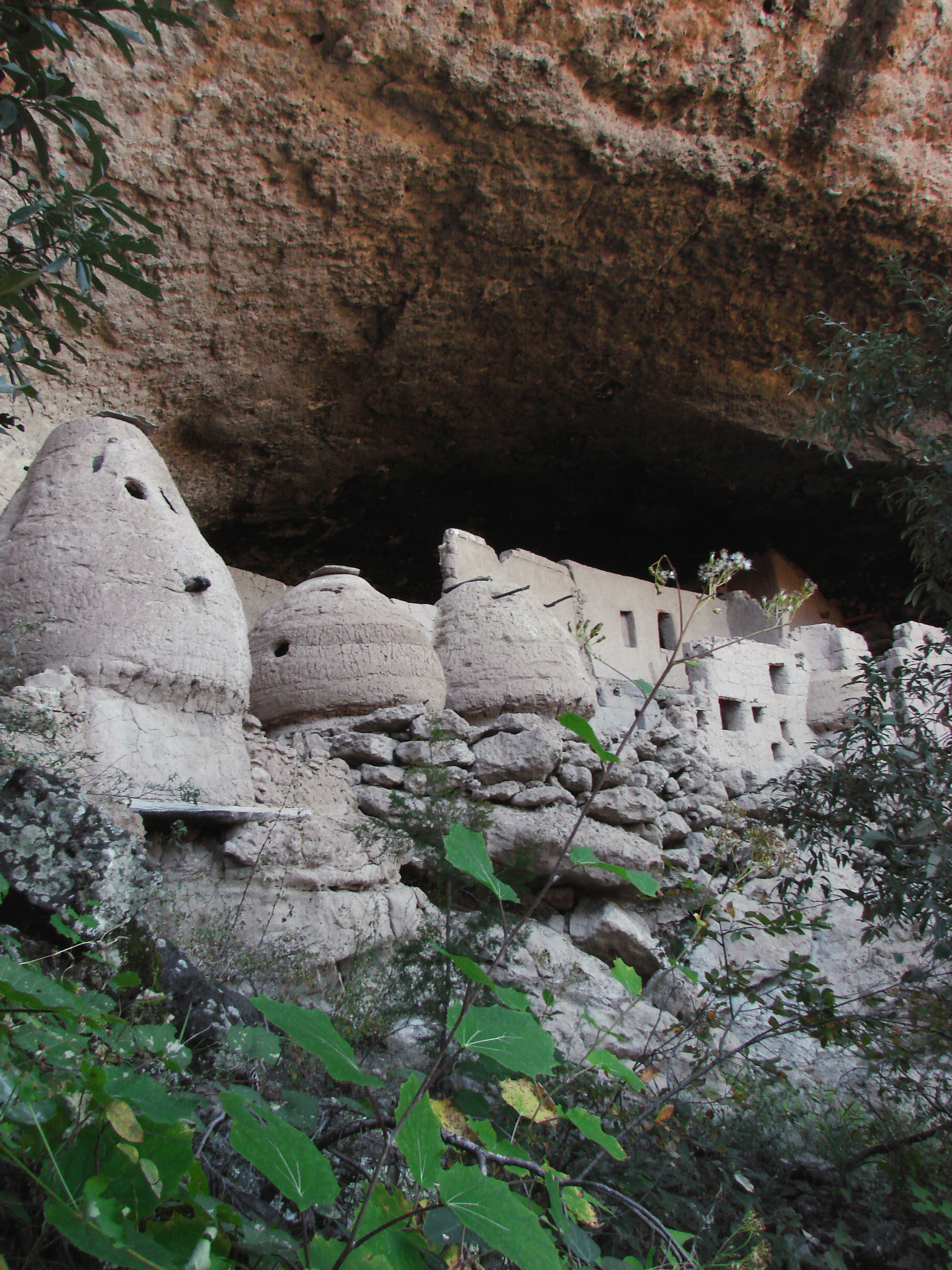
Cueva de las Jarillas

Cueva de las Jarillas is one of the largest housing caves in the Madera region in Chihuahua. It has more than 20 rooms and a Cuexcomate.

=== New Discoveries ===
In one of the Rio Papigochi side canyons, southwest of Madera, is a complex that was inhabited by ancient communities who built homes in the caves and rock shelters. These sites are so safe that, to date, they are virtually intact.

None of these caves can be easily seen from outside the canyon.

==== Cueva de los Fierros ====
Cueva de los Fierros is located in the middle of the canyon slope in an almost vertical wall. Its size is about 30 m and has a complex of at least 10 adobe rooms, some of them in two floors. The whole has a foundation base on which the rooms were built. The windows are "T" shape, which was typical of Paquimé culture.

Almost all the rooms are partially destroyed, though there are ceilings that still preserve the original wooden structure. Inside,some stone tools such as scrapers, knives, grindstones, fragments of pottery and other objects which could not be identified were found. There were many olotes (corn cobs) found, evidence of corn consumptions and storage.

==== Cueva de la Puerta ====
Located a few hundred meters from the first cave, Cueva de la Puerta is found in the middle of the canyon wall. It measures around 25 m and presents vestiges of approximately 12 rooms or enclosures. Vandals or treasure hunters have partially destroyed floors and walls.

For construction, braided rods and branches of local trees were used, mainly tascar (local species of Juniper) and Fraxinus. The builders shaped the adobe walls using the braids. The braids are well preserved and the fibers used to fasten them remain attached. There are two types of fastening: one made with "palmilla" fiber (a species of Century Plant or agave) and the other with a tree branch called "sawarique". In one of the rooms, the original floor can be seen, made from adobe so well and smooth finished that it looks like cement. The roof and walls of the rooms are black, likely due to the accumulation of soot and smoke from fires that were lit there throughout hundreds of years. There is another cave in the opposite side of the canyon, which is smaller with only three rooms and well preserved.

Half a kilometer above is a small cave with a house in pristine condition. With an excellent view of the Canyon, this site was likely an observation or surveillance point.

== Cultural background ==
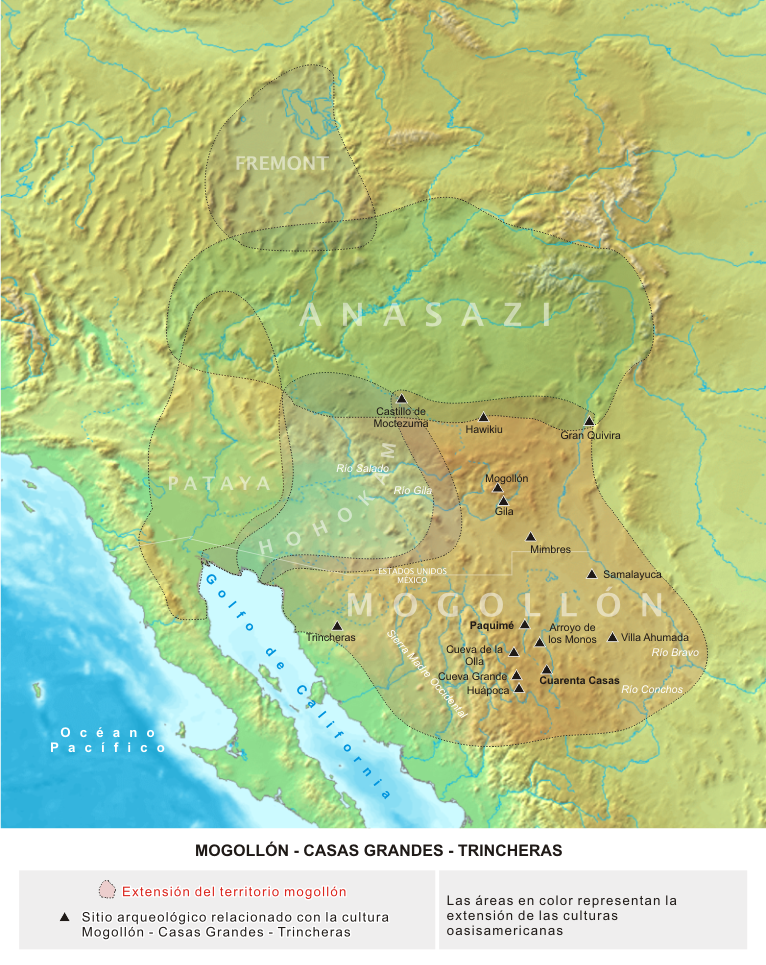
Mogollon and Paquimé Culture Extension

Human groups of hunter-gatherers arrived in the region from the north, most likely from the Mogollon, Anasazi or Hohokam, following the Sierra Madre Occidental. They cultivated crops such as corn, squash, and beans. They also domesticated some smaller animals, such as turkeys. In so doing, they established a system of collective ownership. They occupied the mountains and gradually dispersed near rivers, developing the Paquimé culture or "Casas Grandes", whose first settlers were collectors in the process of learning sedentary traits.

Evidence of the Mogollon (/mʌɡɪˈjoʊn/ or /moʊɡəˈjoʊn/) has been found, such as simple ceramic fragments and other more scarce luxury materials that were characteristic of the Paquime culture. The Site constructors were likely villagers who made use of the environment, as can be seen in the premises vestiges.

Significant evidence exists of northern Mexican settlers of the Casas Grandes culture, a sub-region of the Mogollon culture. It, along with the Anasazi and the Hohokam cultures, comprise the Oasisamerica area. The northern cultural region is known in Mexico as "Gran Chichimeca" and in the United States is called American Southwest.

Paquimé was the commercial center of the region. The first settlements in this culture are dated circa. 1000 BCE. Since the late archaic; its apogee occurred between 1261 and 1300 CE and disappeared in 1450 CE.

Sites of the culture are found from the Pacific Ocean coast to the Sierra Madre Occidental, passing through all kinds of ecological and climate environments.

== The Site ==
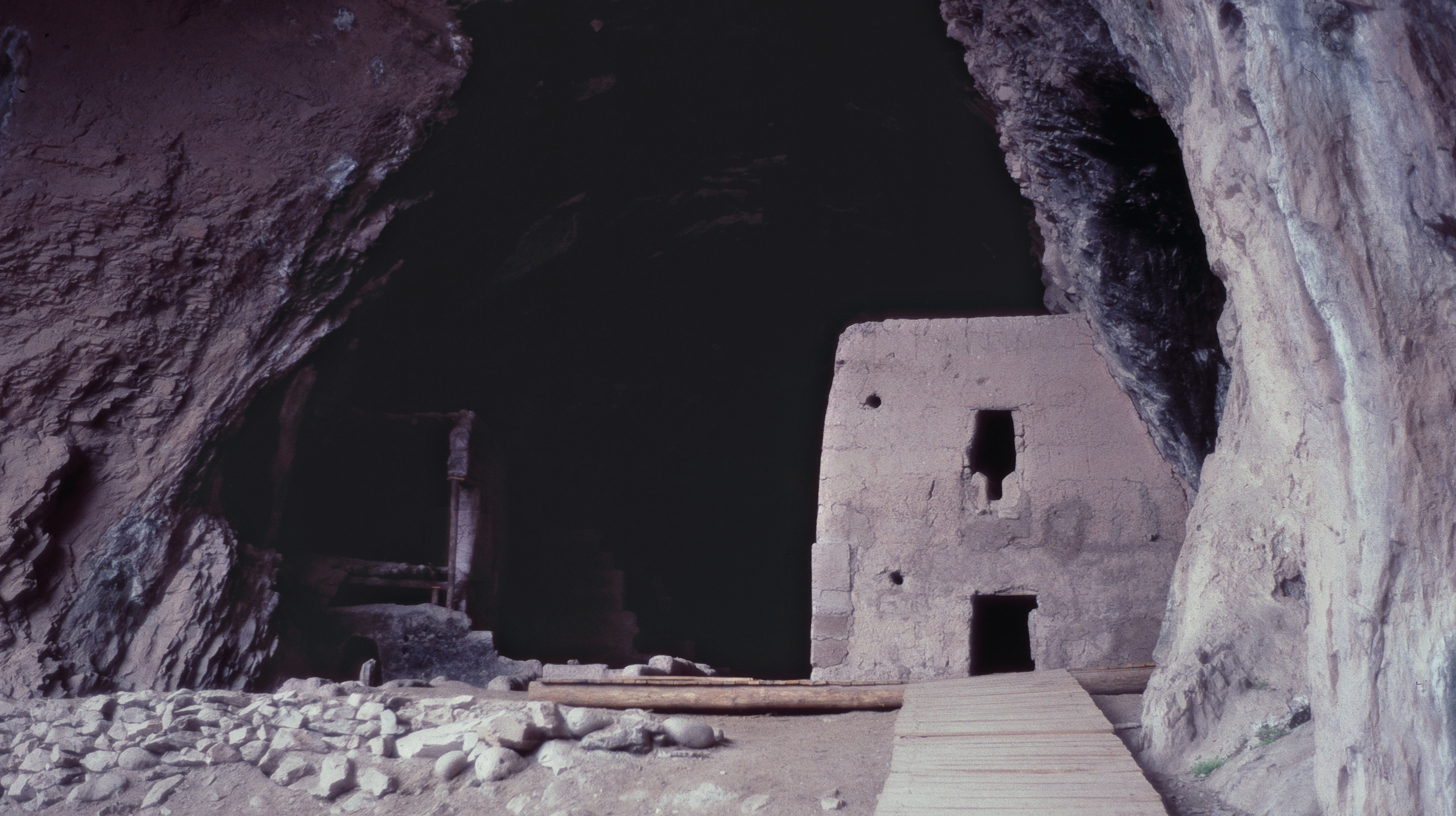
Cueva Grande

The site is an archeological complex near the hot springs Huapoca, consisting of caves containing vestiges of the Casas Grandes culture.

The construction was made with adobe and fiber reinforcement, with structures built on cliffs. These structures are well-preserved.

The Huápoca caves consist of the "Serpiente" and the Nido de Aguila caves, which have complete structures.

Both caves have magnificent views of the Huápoca Canyon.

The remaining site depicts cultural construction patterns similar to the entire region.

=== Cueva Grande ===
It is a vast and deep cave 3 km west of river Huapoca and Spa. It is a complex of two floors. A cascade falls on the entrance of the cave.

- 29°11′20.5″N 108°20′35.4″W

=== Cueva de la Serpiente ===
It comprises constructions in perfect preservation conditions. It is a residential complex with about 15 rooms, each with characteristic "T" shaped doors. The cave has two entrances and a passage through a rocky outcrop, accessible through a ladder.

- 29°12′49.9″N 108°19′59.2″W

=== Nido del Águila ===
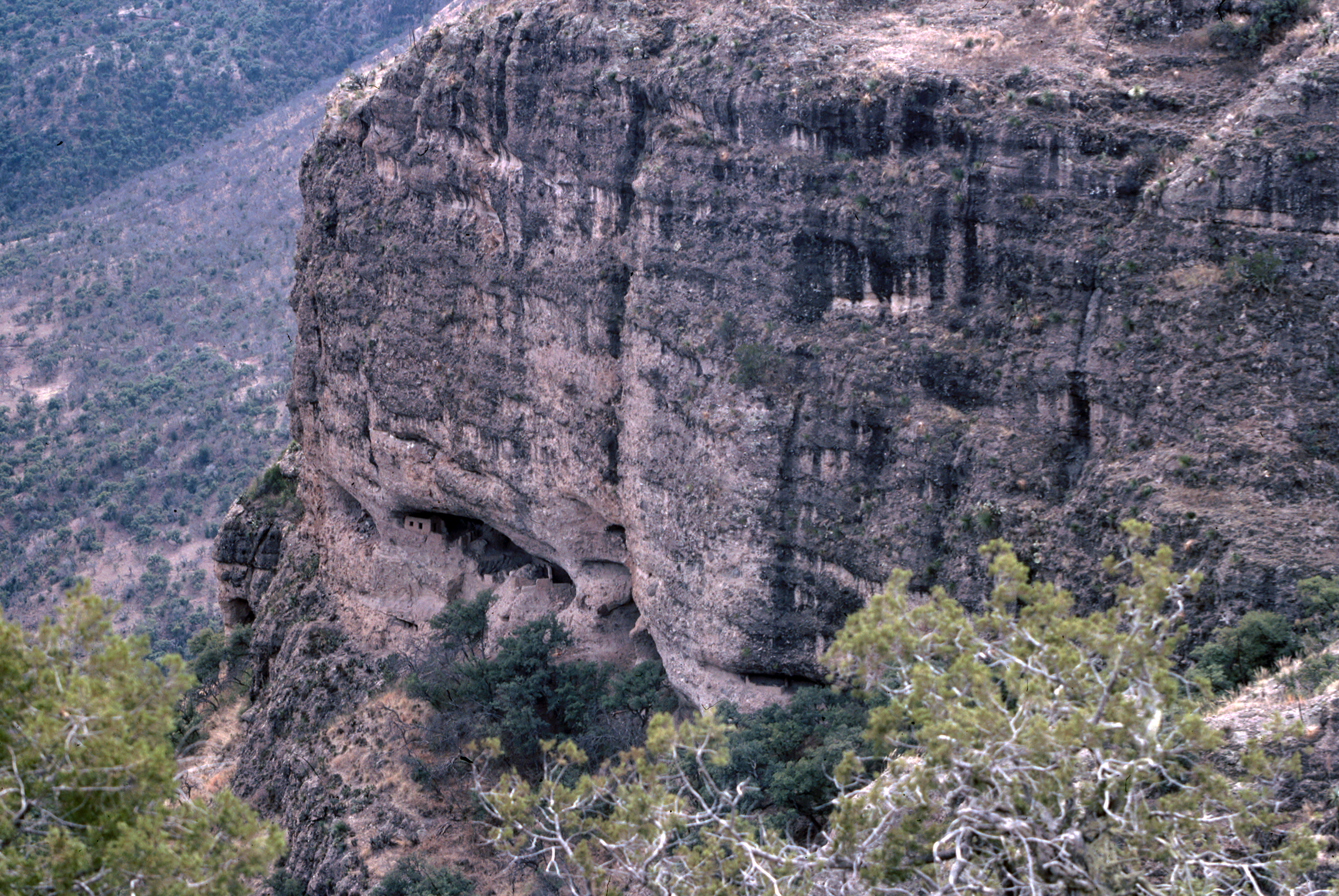
Nido del Águila

This cave is composed of several small houses in a rock edge, at an elevation of two-thirds of the height of the almost vertical cliff. It is a smaller cave with two buildings: one with at least three rooms situated on the edge of the cliff, and the other a two-story room in the middle of the cave’s esplanade.

- 29°12′27.5″N 108°19′55.3″W

== See also ==
- Cueva de la Olla (archaeological site)
- Cueva de la Ranchería
