= Madera Municipality =

Municipality in the Mexican state of Chihuahua

Madera
- Municipality
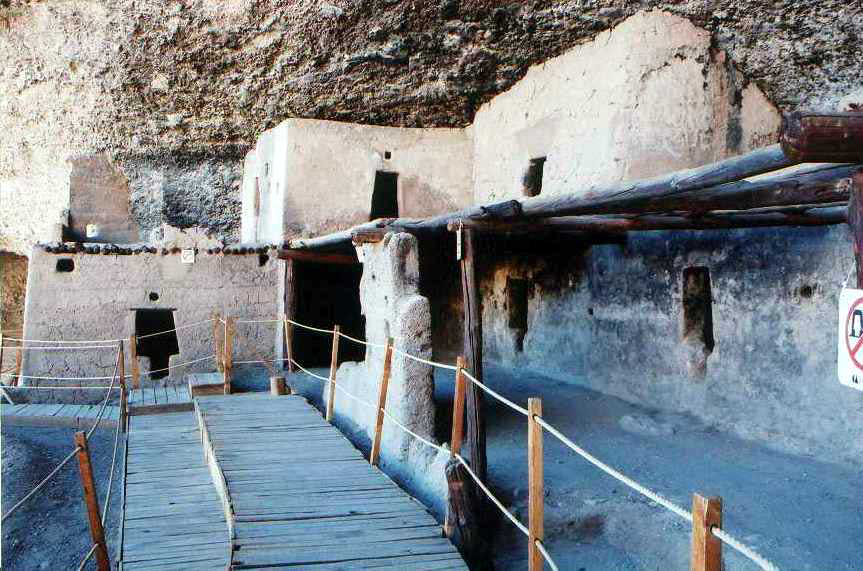
- Cuarenta Casas

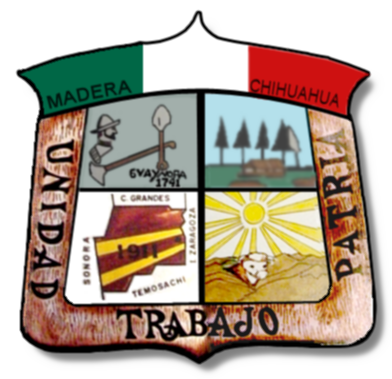
- Coat of arms

- Municipality of Madera in Chihuahua

- Location in Mexico
- Coordinates: 29°12′N 108°8′W
- Country: Mexico
- State: Chihuahua
- Municipal seat: Madera

Area
  - Total: 8,158.8 km^{2} (3,150.1 sq mi)

Population (2020)
  - Total: 25,144
  - Density: 3.0818/km^{2} (7.9819/sq mi)

Madera is one of the 67 municipalities of Chihuahua, in the Sierra Nevada mountains of northern Mexico. The municipal seat lies at Madera. The municipality covers an area of 8,158.8 km^{2}.

As of 2010, the municipality had a total population of 29,611, down from 32,031 as of 2005.

As of 2010, the city of Madera had a population of 15,447. Other than the city of Madera, the municipality had 600 localities, the largest of which (with 2010 populations in parentheses) were: El Largo (3,522), Nicolás Bravo (1,862), classified as urban, and Las Varas (Estación Babícora) (1,417) and Mesa del Huracán (Chihuahuita) (1,102), classified as rural.

The economy is primarily based on logging, madera meaning wood in Spanish. There is also some agriculture and cattle ranches in the municipality.

The municipality is also known for its caves and parks and within a 50 km radius of the town there are many caves featuring pre-Columbian artworks.

== Geography ==
=== Towns and villages ===
The municipality has 226 localities. The largest are:

Name	Population (2020)
Madera	14,755
El Largo Maderal	2,959
Nicolás Bravo	1,323
Mesa del Huracán	1,093
Las Varas (Estación Babícora)	1,012
La Norteña	640
Arroyo Amplio	440
Total Municipality	25,144

== Crime ==
A narcofosa (mass grave attributed to organized crime) containing the remains of women killed in 2011 and 2012 was found in Madera in December 2016.
