= Three Rivers Petroglyph Site =

Archaeological site in New Mexico

Three Rivers Petroglyph site
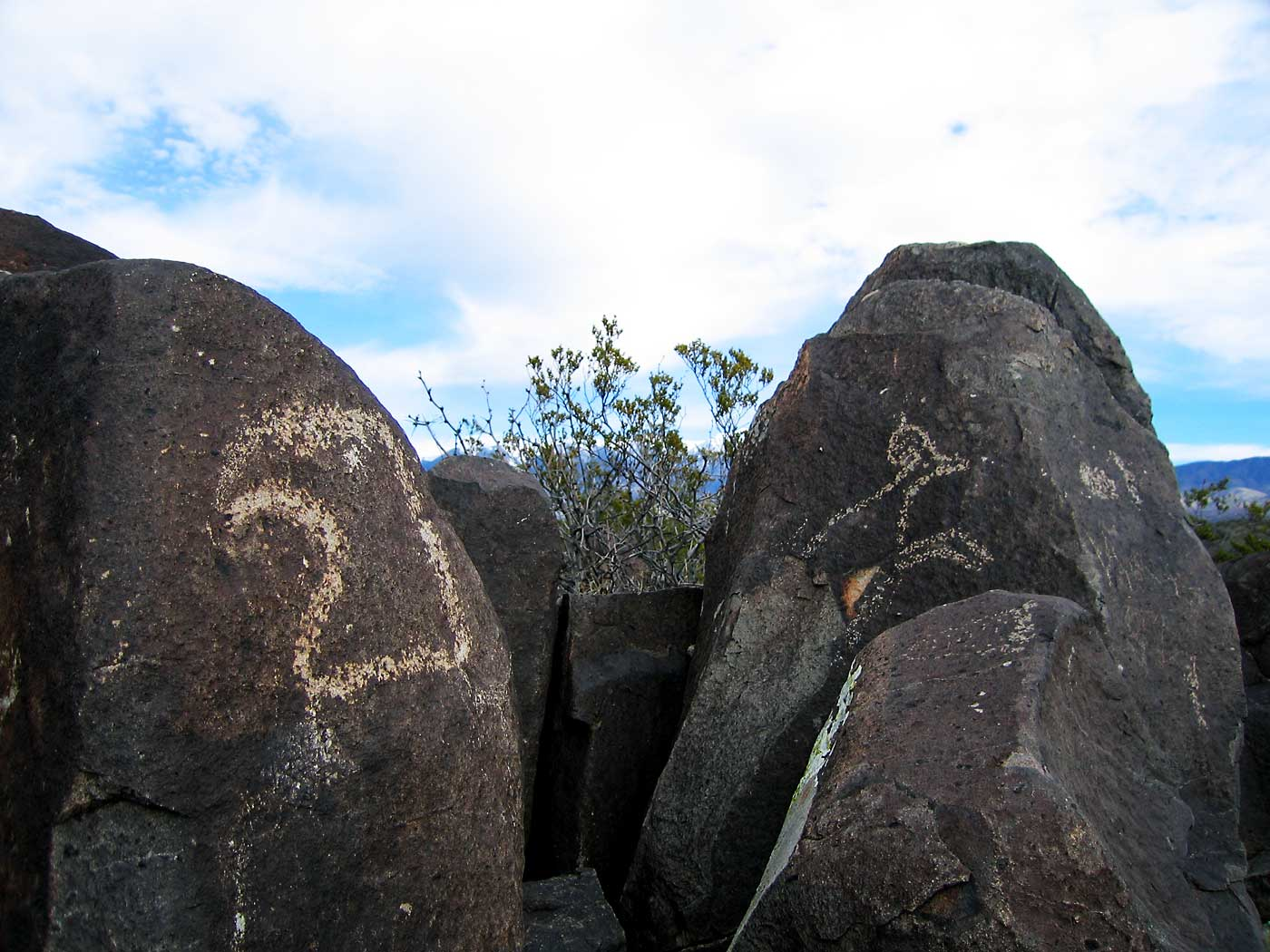
- Petroglyphs of animals at the site

- Location within New Mexico Location within the United States
- 33.346944°N 106.011667°W
- Cultures: Mogollon culture
- Location: Otero County, New Mexico

There are over 21,000 petroglyphs at the Three Rivers Petroglyph Site at Three Rivers, New Mexico, located midway between Tularosa and Carrizozo in Otero County on Highway 54. Many of the petroglyphs can be easily viewed from a trail open to the public which winds through the rocks for about one mile. The petroglyphs are thought to be the product of the Jornada Mogollon people between about 1000 and 1400 AD. The site is protected and maintained by the Bureau of Land Management.

The locale is called Three Rivers because Indian Creek, Golondrina ("Swallow") Creek, and Three Rivers come together near the site. The petroglyphs at Three Rivers were recorded during a six-year project by the Archaeological Society of New Mexico's Rock Art Recording Field Schools. Photographs and records are on file at the Bureau of Land Management's District Office in Las Cruces.

== Gallery ==
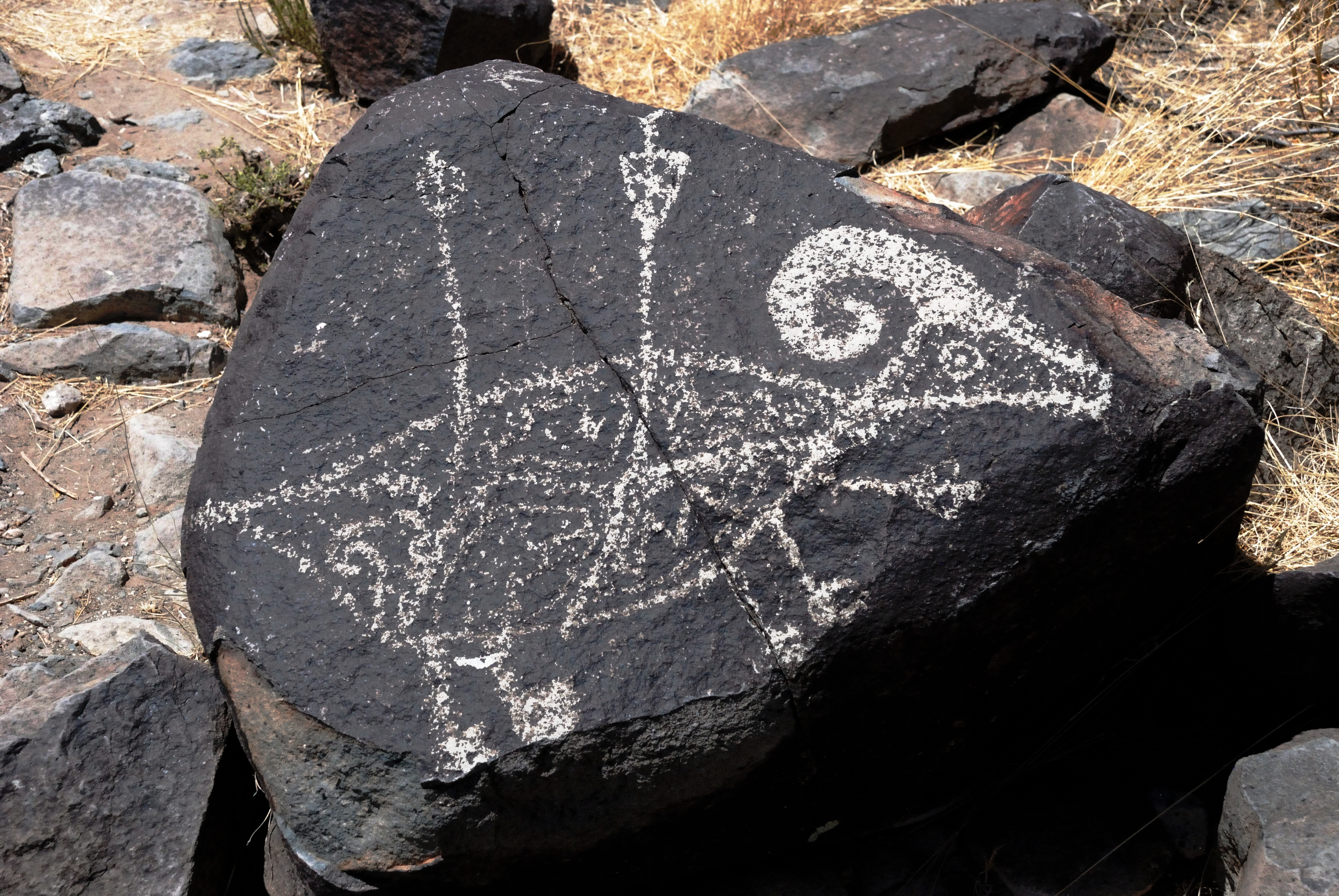
A petroglyph depicting a bighorn sheep; arrows or spears protrude from its body.

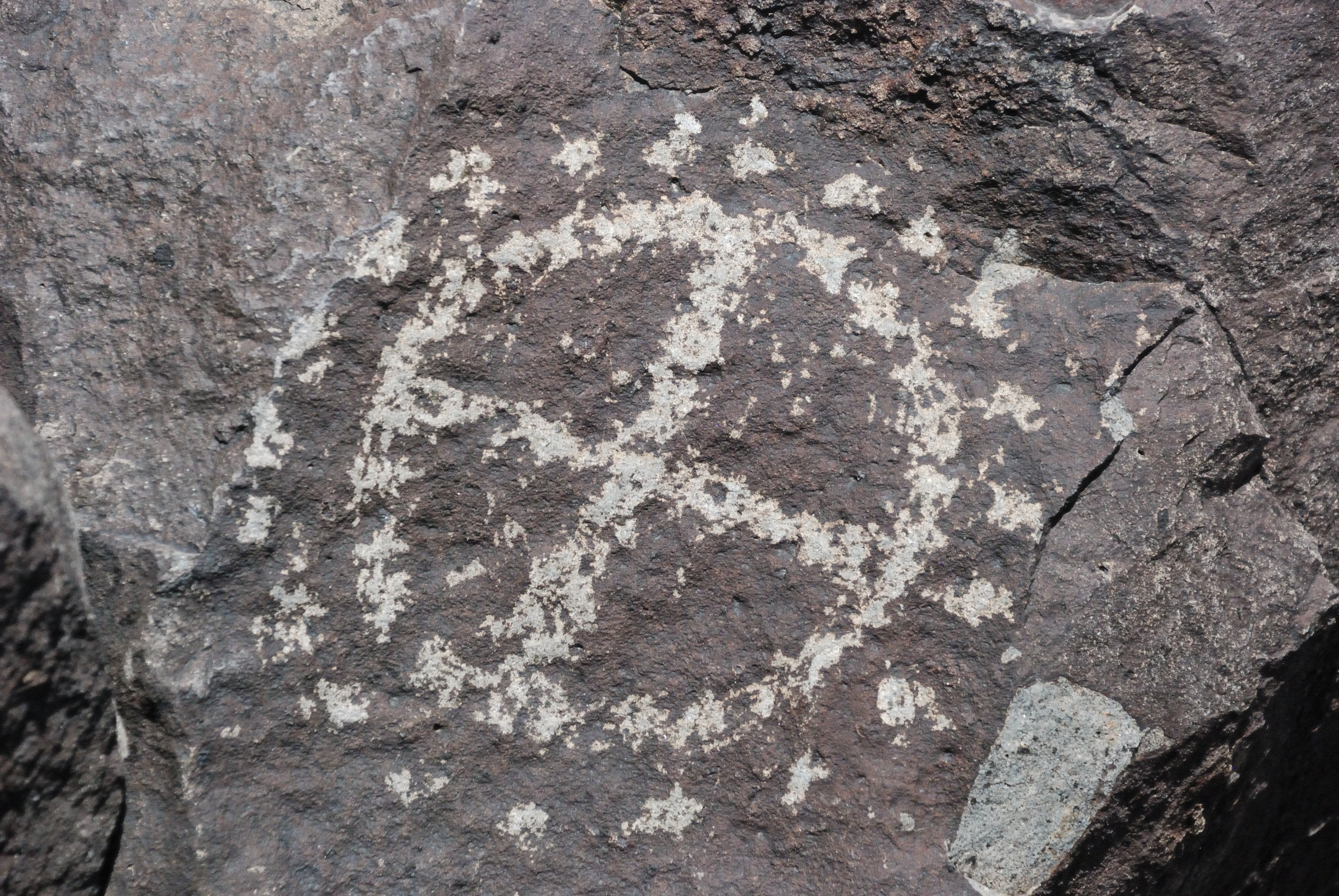
One of many circle and dot motifs at the site.

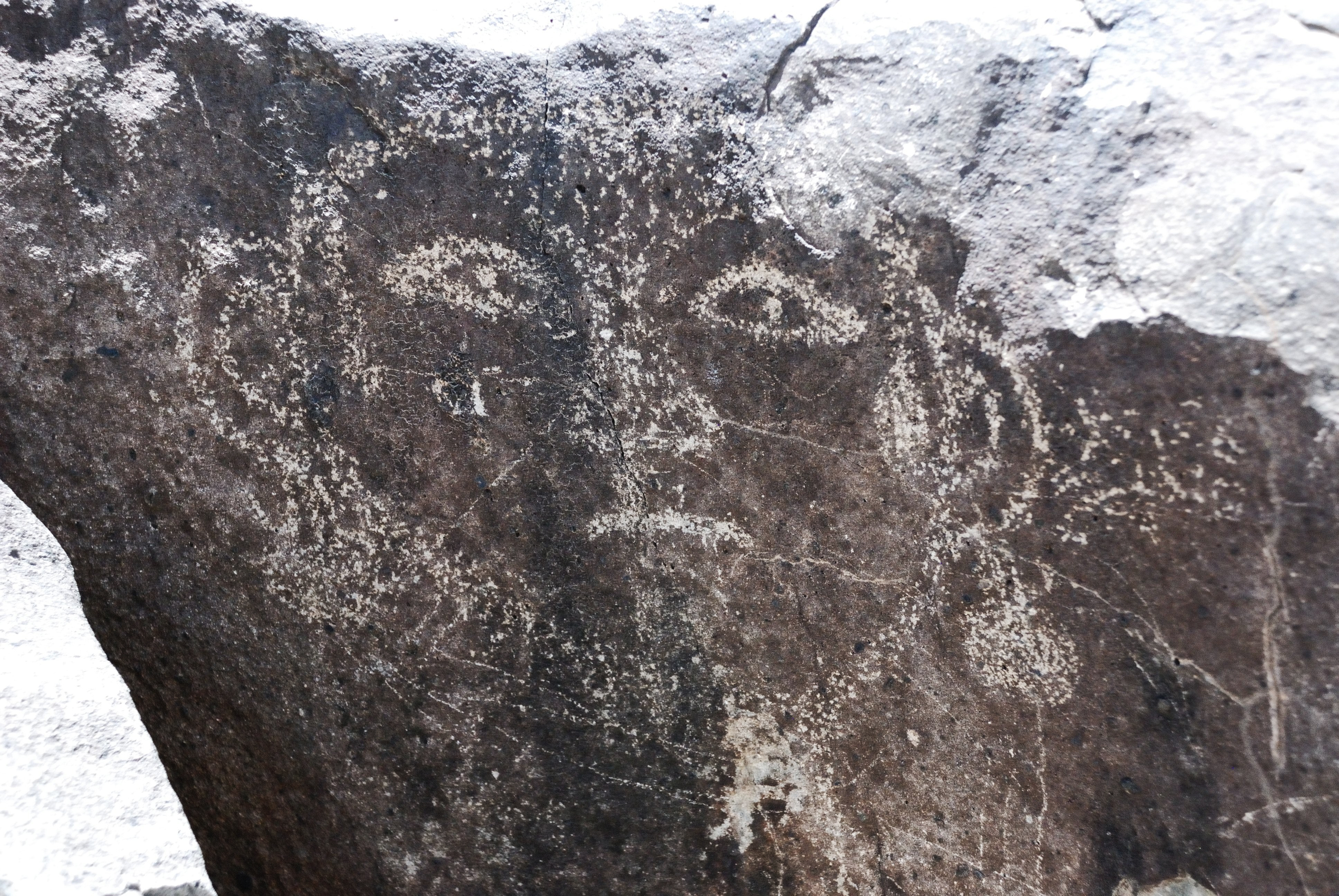
A petroglyph depicting a face or mask.

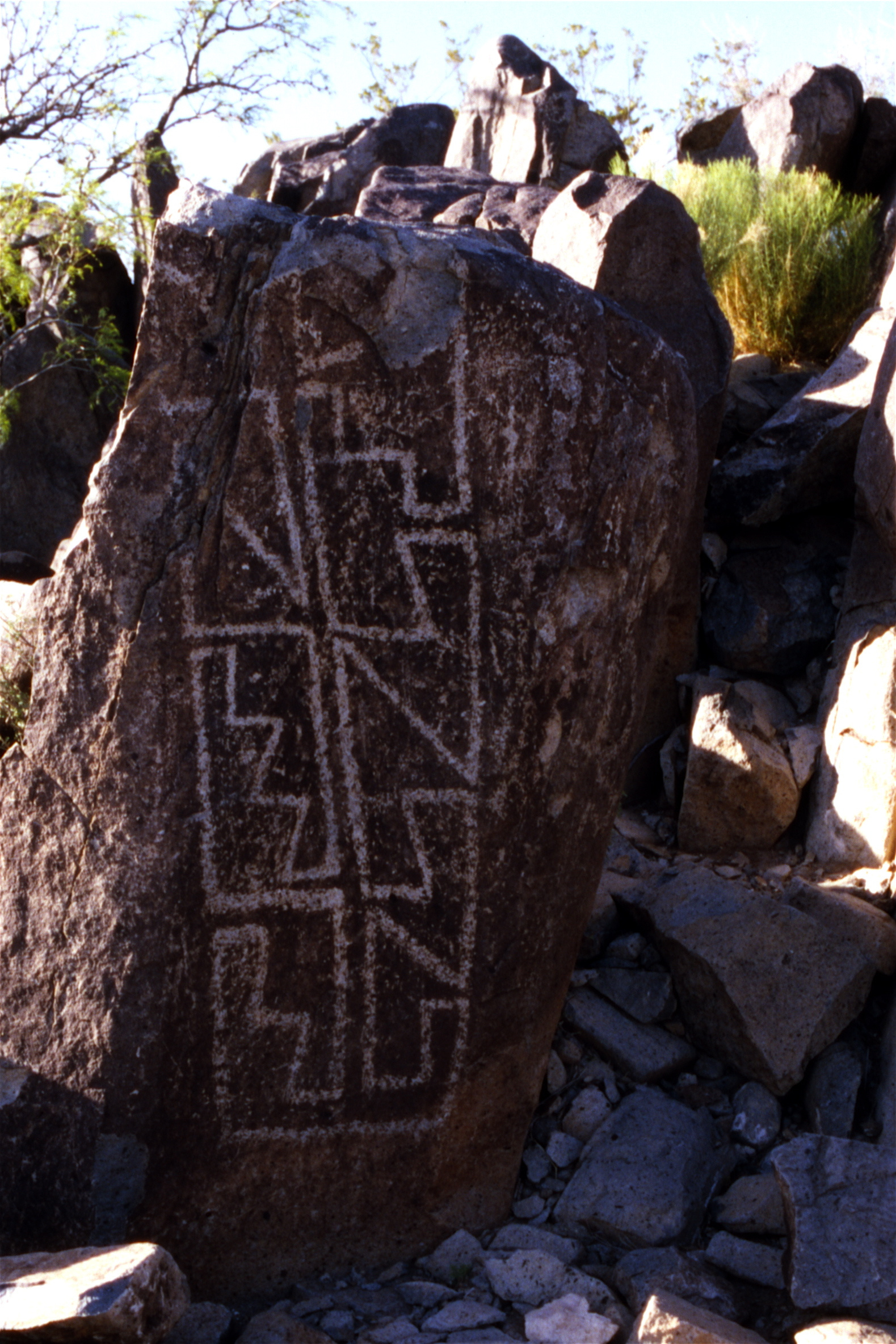
A geometric glyph

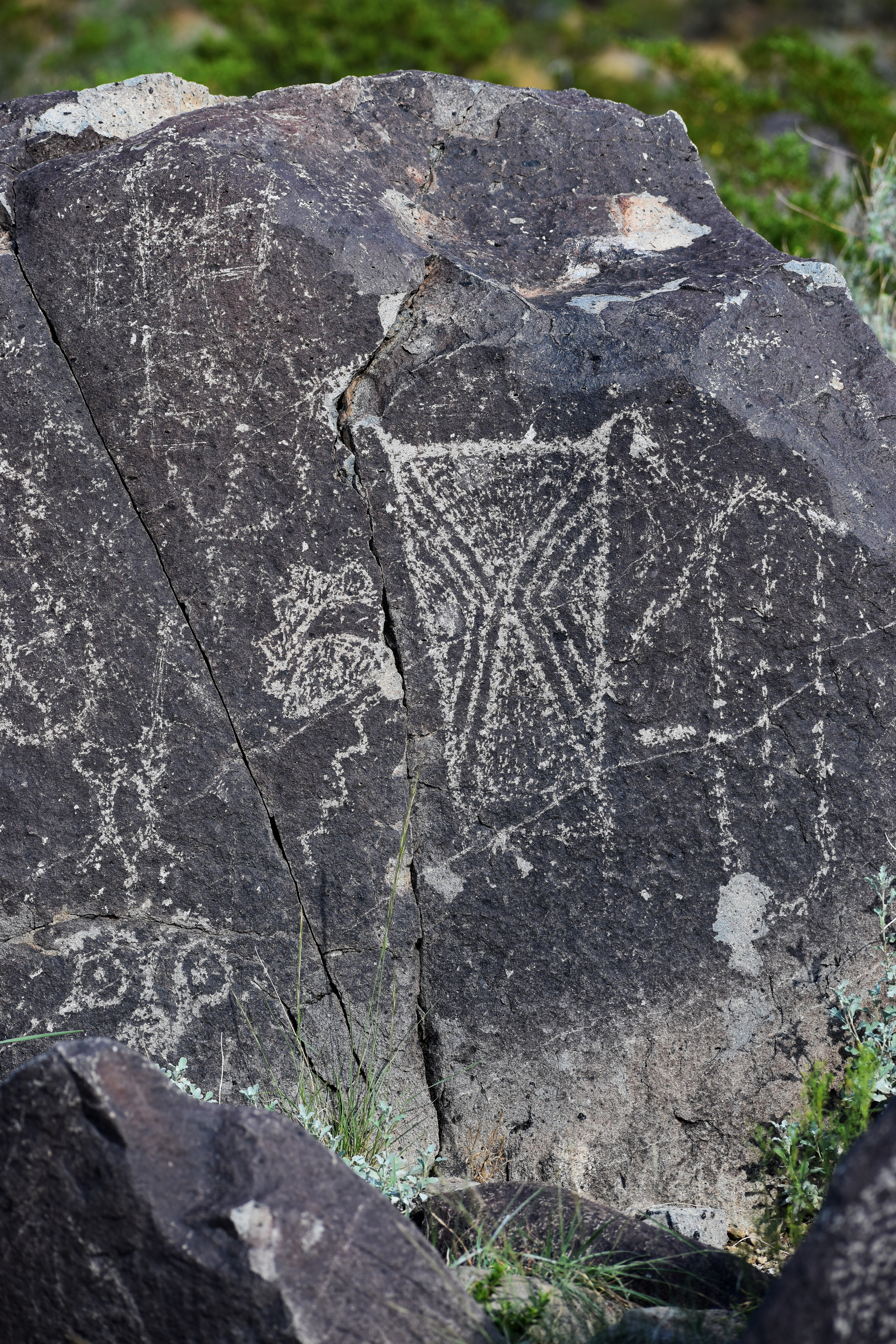
Anthropomorphic figure decorated with abstract designs.

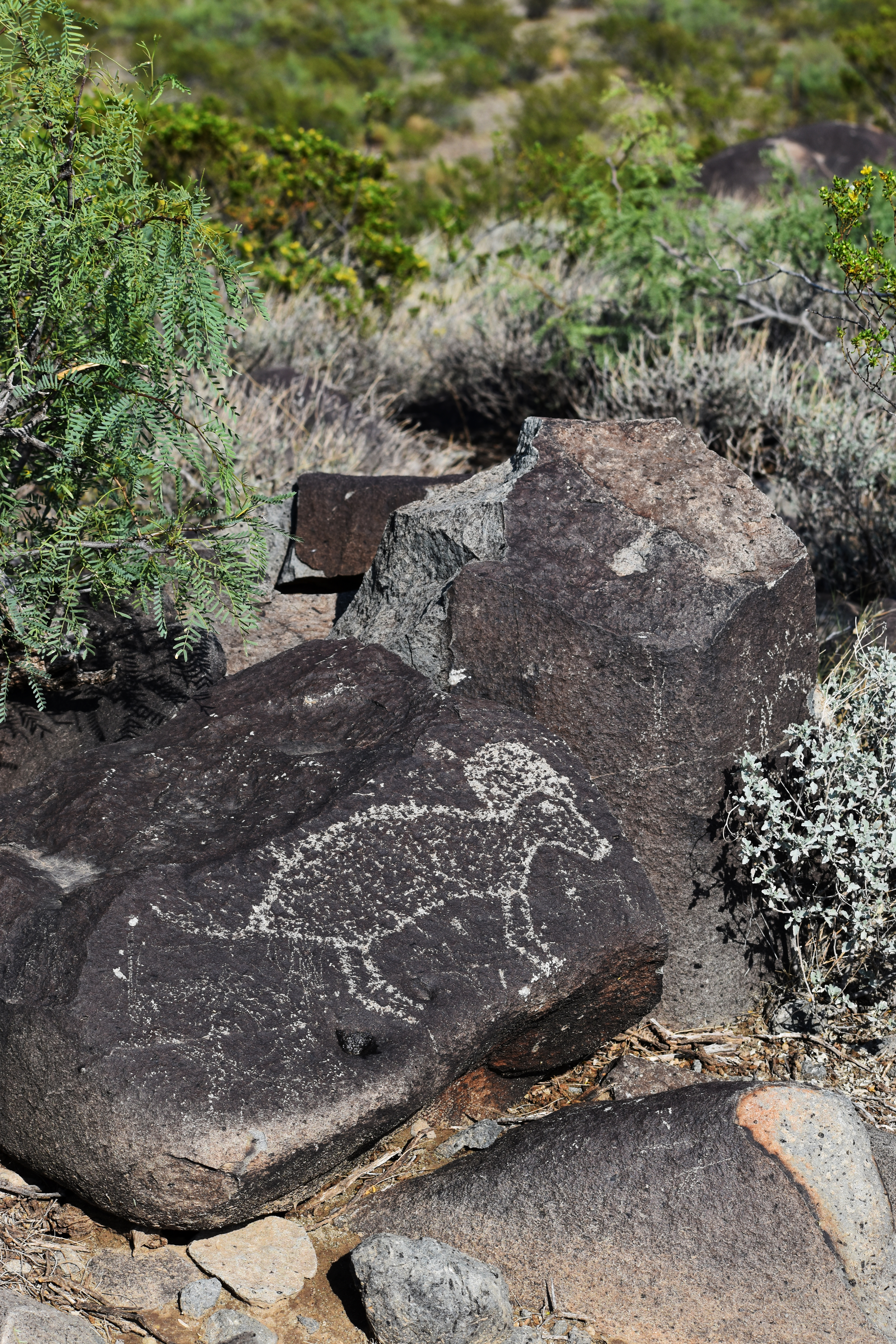
A glyph depicting an animal—possibly a sheep.
