= Cueva Grande =

Village in Zacatecas, Mexico

Coordinates: 22°42′N 103°17′W

Cueva Grande is a village in the municipality of Valparaíso, State of Zacatecas, Mexico. The village has 235 inhabitants and is located 2,040 meters (6,690 ft) above sea level.
