= Mogollon culture =

Prehistoric culture of the southwest United States and northern Mexico

Map of major prehistoric archaeological cultures in the southwestern United States and northwestern Mexico

The Mogollon culture (/ˌmoʊɡəˈjoʊn/ moh-gə-YOHN) is a pre-historic archaeological culture of Native American peoples from Southern New Mexico and Arizona, Northern Sonora and Chihuahua, and Western Texas. The northern part of this region is Oasisamerica, while the southern span of the Mogollon culture is known as Aridoamerica.

The Mogollon culture is one of the most well known prehistoric Southwestern cultural divisions of the Southwestern United States and Northern Mexico. The culture flourished from the archaic period, c. 200 CE, to either 1450 or 1540 CE, when the Spanish arrived.

== Etymology ==
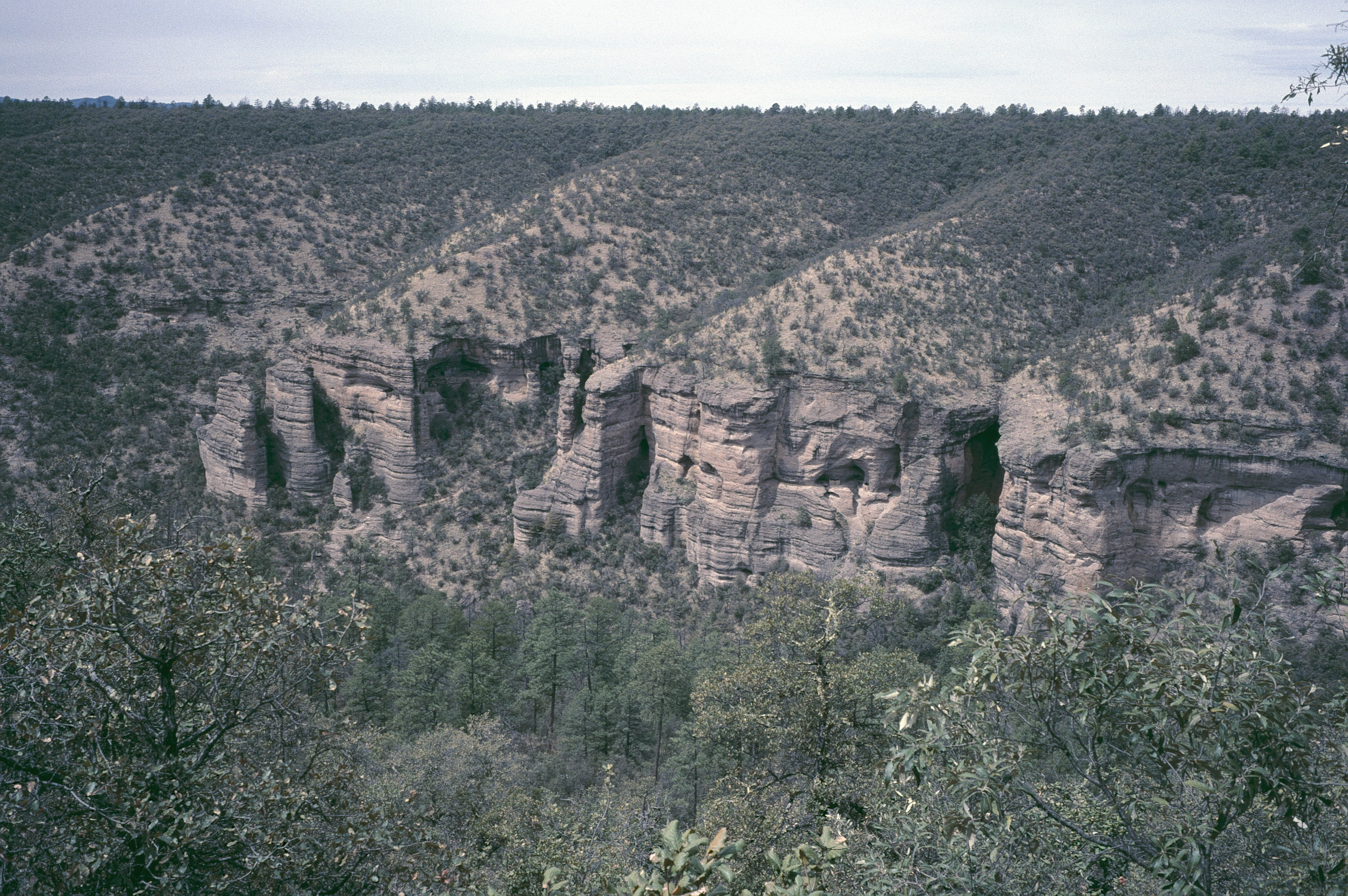
The rock wall of the canyon, the Cueva de las Ventanas cliff-dwelling is located left of center above a debris-covered cone.

The name Mogollon comes from the Mogollon Mountains, which were named after Juan Ignacio Flores Mogollón, Spanish Governor of New Spain (including what is now New Mexico) from 1712 to 1715. The name was chosen and defined in 1936 by archaeologist Emil W. Haury.

== Cultural traits ==
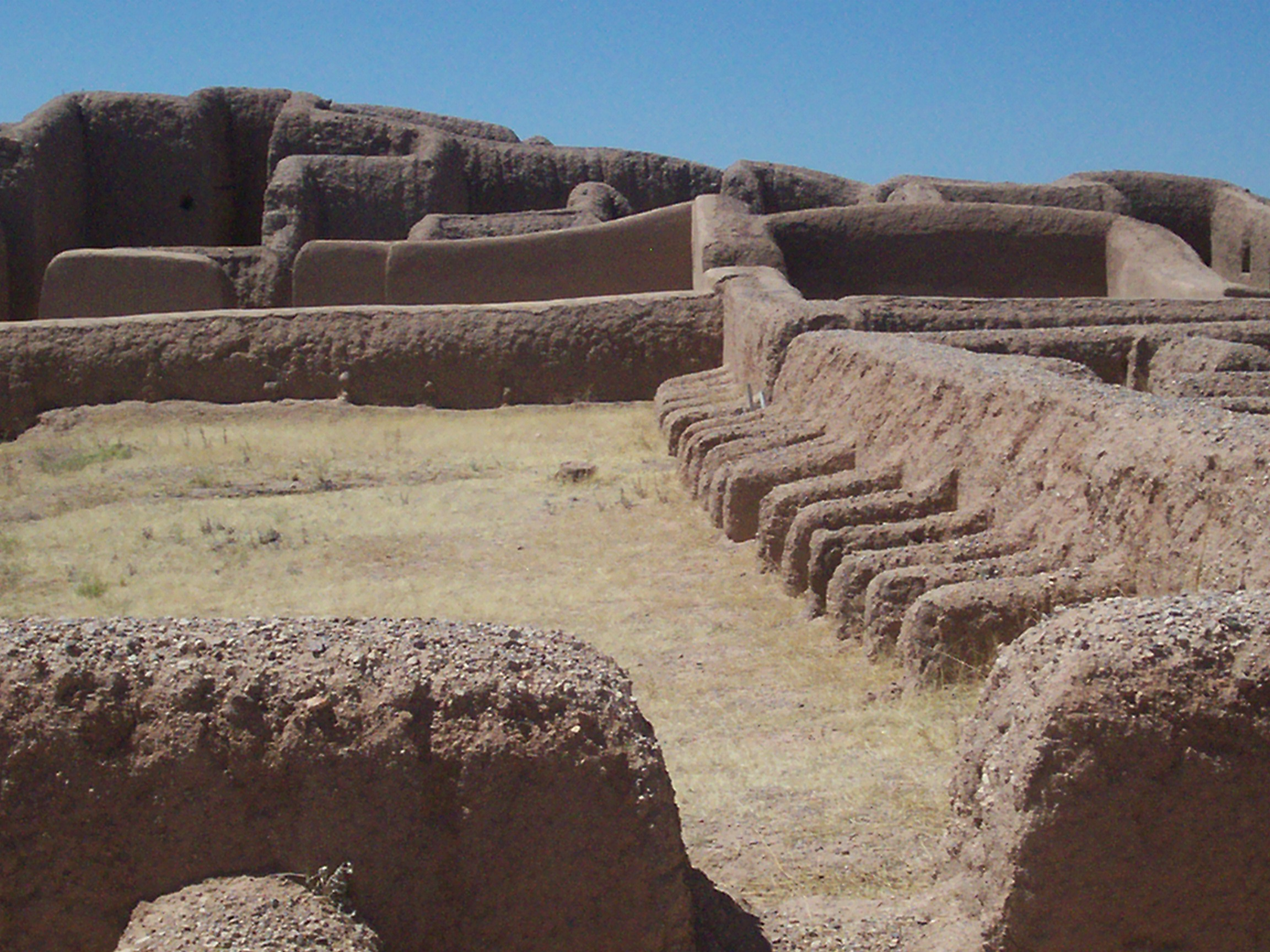
Macaw Pens at Paquimé, Chihuahua

The distinct facets of Mogollon culture were recorded by Emil Haury, based on his excavations in 1931, 1933, and 1934 at the Harris Village in Mimbres, New Mexico, and the Mogollon Village on the upper San Francisco River in New Mexico Haury recognized differences between architecture and artifacts from these sites as compared with sites in the Hohokam archaeological culture area and the Ancestral Pueblo archaeological culture area. Key differences included brown-paste, coil-and-scrape pottery, deeply excavated semi-subterranean pit-houses and different ceremonial architecture. Eight decades of subsequent research have confirmed Haury's initial findings. Today, the distinctiveness of the Mogollon pottery manufacture, architectural construction, ground-stone tool design, habits and customs of residence location, and mortuary treatment is generally recognized.

The earliest Mogollon pithouses were deep and either circular or oval-shaped. Over time, Mogollon people built pit houses that were not as deep and were rectangular with rounded corners. Their villages also had round, semi-subterranean ceremonial structures called kivas.

== History ==
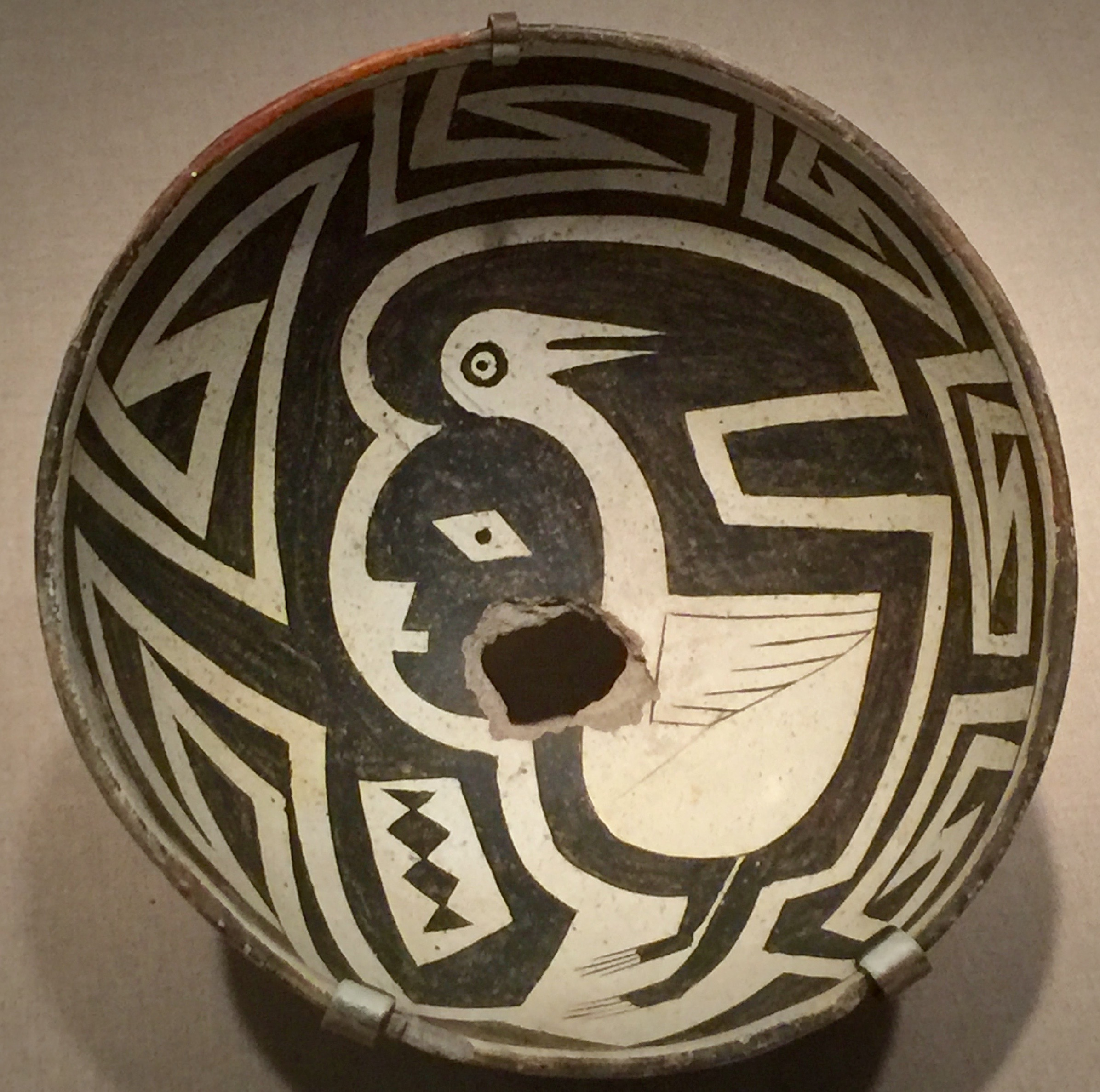
Man and crane, Mangas-Mimbres pot, c. 1000 CE, showing figure-ground reversal

Mogollon origins remain a matter of speculation. One theory is that the Mogollon emerged from a Desert Archaic tradition linked to the first prehistoric human occupations of the area during the late Pleistocene, around 9000 BC. In this theory, cultural distinctions emerged in the larger region when populations grew enough to establish villages and larger communities. An alternative theory is that the Mogollon descended from migrants from farming regions in central Mexico around 3500 BC, displacing descendants of the Desert Archaic peoples. A third theory is that Mogollon descended from the late Desert Archaic Cochise culture, who had arrived around 5000 BC, were not linked to the earlier inhabitants, and adopted farming from Central Mexico.

Initially, the Mogollon were foragers who augmented their subsistence by farming. But during the first millennium CE, dependence on farming probably increased. Water control features are common among Mimbres branch sites from the 10th through 12th centuries CE.

The nature and density of Mogollon villages changed over time. The earliest villages consist of several pit-houses. Villages grew and by the 11th century surface pueblos became common. They had ground-level houses with walls of rock and earth and roofs supported by post and beam networks. In the 13th and 14th centuries, cliff-dwellings became common.

Research on Mogollon culture has led to the recognition of regional variants, of which the most widely recognized in popular media is the Mimbres culture (Mimbres Mogollon branch). Others include the Jornada, Forestdale, Reserve, Point of Pines (or "Black River"), San Simon, and Upper Gila branches. Although the Mimbres culture is the best-known subset of the Mogollon archaeological culture-area, the entire Mogollon occupation spans a greater interval of time (roughly one millennium) and a vastly larger area than is encompassed by the Mimbres culture.

=== Developmental periods ===
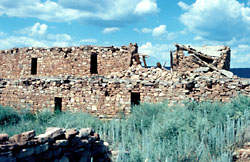
Kinishba Ruins near Fort Apache, Arizona

Mogollon culture is often divided into five periods proposed by Joe Ben Wheat in 1955:

- Mogollon 1 (200 – c. 400 CE): Pine Lawn, Georgetown, Penasco, Circle Prairie, and Hilltop phases
- Mogollon 2 (c. 400–650 CE): San Lorenzo, Dos Cabezas, Circle Prairie, and Cottonwood phases
- Mogollon 3 (650–850 CE): San Francisco, Pinaleno, Galiuro, Forestdale, and San Marcial phases
- Mogollon 4 (850–1000 CE): Three Circle, Cerros, Corduroy, Mesilla, and Capitan phases
- Mogollon 5 (1000–1450 CE), including the Classic Mimbres phrase (1050–1200 CE): Mangus, Mimbres, Encinas, Reserve, Tularosa, Dona Anna, Three Rivers, El Paso, and San Anders phases.

Another way to divide Mogollon history is in three periods of housing types:

- Early Pithouse (200–550 CE)
- Late Pithouse (550–1000 CE)
- Mogollon Pueblo (1000–1450 CE).

== Sites ==
Archaeological sites attributed to the Mogollon culture are found in the Gila Wilderness, Mimbres River Valley, along the Upper Gila river, Paquime and Hueco Tanks, an area of low mountains between the Franklin Mountains to the west and the Hueco Mountains to the east, and Three Rivers Petroglyph Site, 17 miles north of Tularosa, New Mexico. Gila Cliff Dwellings National Monument in southwestern New Mexico was established as a national monument on 16 November 1907. It contains several archaeological sites attributed to the Mimbres branch. At the headwaters of the Gila, Mimbres populations adjoined another more northern branch of the Mogollon culture. The TJ Ruin, for example, is a Classic Mimbres phase pueblo, however the cliff dwellings are Tularosa phase. The Hueco Tanks State Historic Site is approximately 32 mi (51 km) northeast of El Paso, Texas.

== Mimbres branch ==
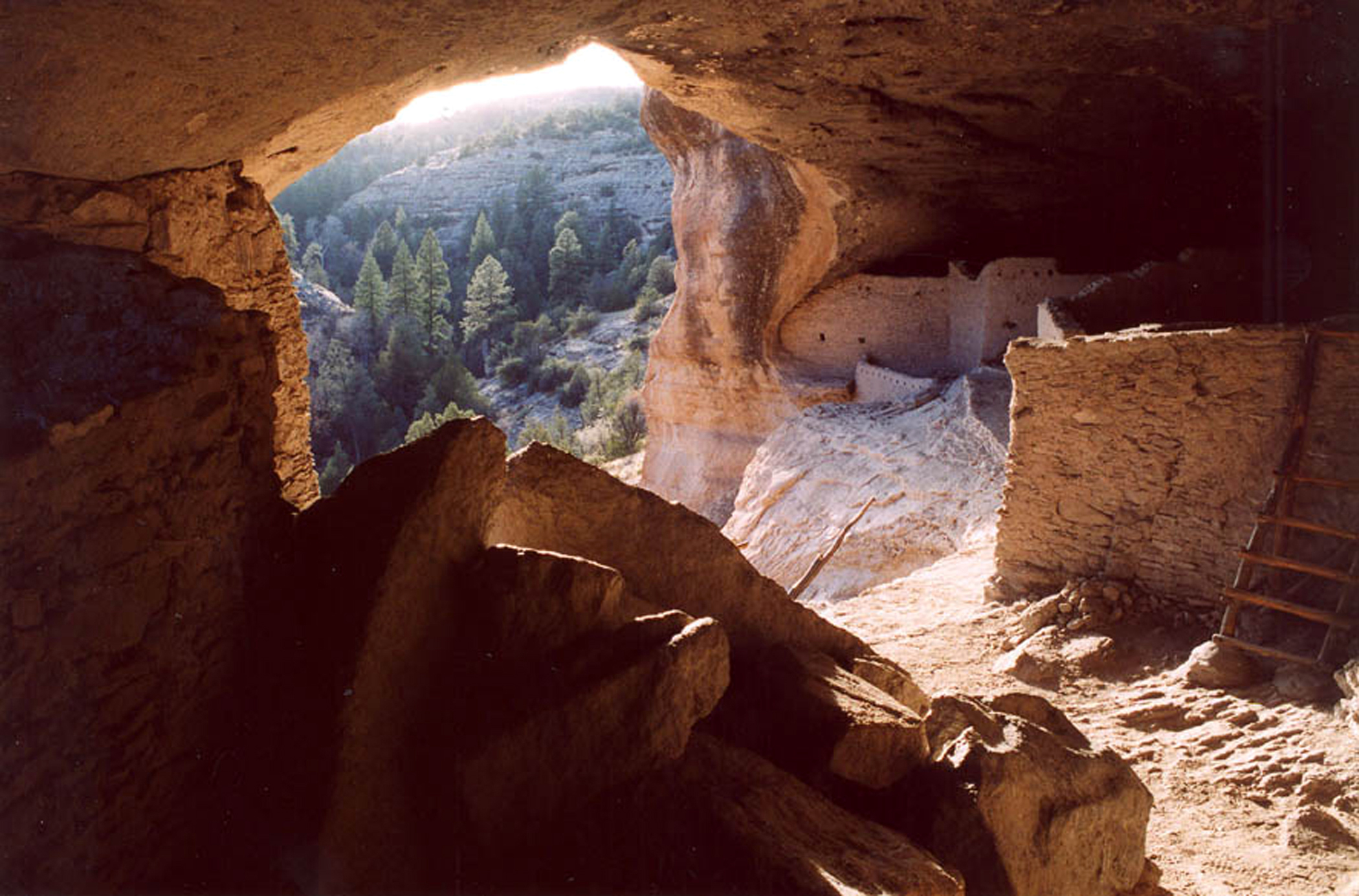
Looking out from one of the Gila Cliff cave dwellings

Mimbres may, depending on its context, refer to a tradition within a subregion of the Mogollon culture area (the Mimbres branch or the Mimbres Mogollon) or to an interval of time, the "Classic Mimbres phase" (also known as the "Mimbres culture"; 1000–1130 CE, roughly) within the Mimbres branch.

The Mimbres branch is a subset of the larger Mogollon culture area, centered in the Mimbres Valley and encompassing the upper Gila River and parts of the upper San Francisco River in southwestern New Mexico and southeastern Arizona as well as the Rio Grande Valley and its western tributaries in southwest New Mexico. Differentiation between the Mimbres branch and other areas of the Mogollon culture area is most apparent during the Three Circle (825–1000 CE roughly) and Classic Mimbres (1000–1150) phases, when architectural construction and black and white painted pottery assume locally distinctive forms and styles. Classic Mimbres phase pottery is particularly famous pottery, and Classic Mimbres pottery designs (mainly drawn from the Swarts Ruin excavations of 1924–1927) were imitated on Santa Fe Railroad "Mimbreños" china dinnerware from 1936 to 1970.

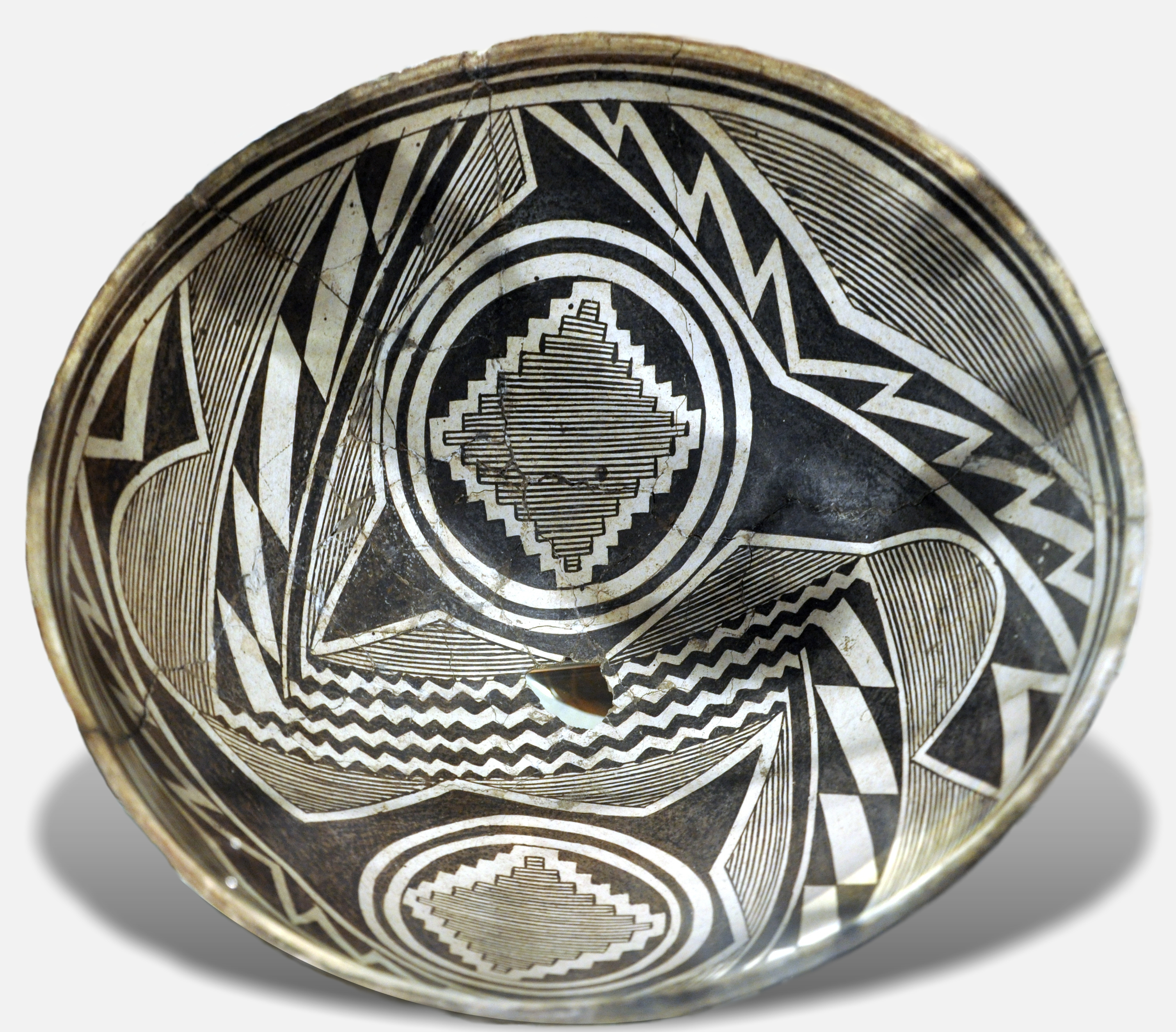
Mimbres sub-group pot with geometric design

Three Circle phase (825/850–1000) pit-house villages within the Mimbres branch are distinctive. Houses are "quadrilateral", usually with sharply-angled corners; plastered floors and walls; and average about 17 m^{2} (180 sq ft) in floor surface area. Local pottery styles include early forms of Mimbres black and white ("boldface"), red-on-cream, and textured plainware. Large ceremonial structures (often called "kivas", a Hopi language term with specific meaning, has generally been applied to Northern Pueblo populations and may be a poor term in discussing the Mogollon in their broadest contexts) are dug deeply into the ground and often include distinctive ceremonial features such as foot drums and log grooves.

Classic Mimbres phase (AD 1000–1130) pueblos can be quite large, with some composed of clusters of communities, each containing up to 150 rooms and all grouped around an open plaza. Ceremonial structures were different from the previous pit-house periods. Most common were ceremonial rooms within roomblocks. Smaller square or rectangular semi-subterranean kivas with roof openings are also found. The largest Classic Mimbres sites are located near wide areas of well-watered floodplain suitable for maize agriculture, although smaller villages exist in upland areas.

=== Mimbres pottery ===
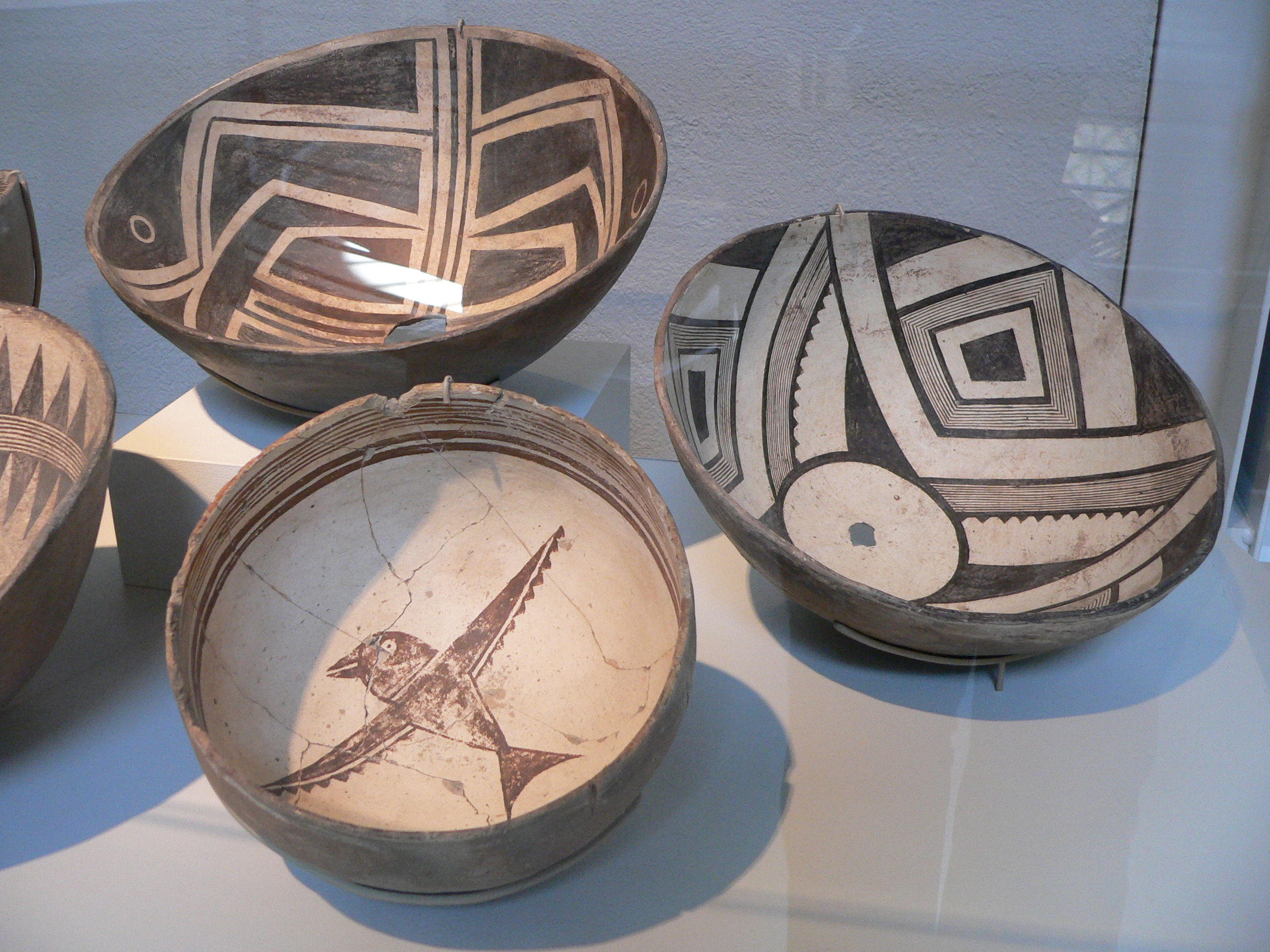
Mimbres bowls at Stanford University

Ceramics, especially bowls, produced in the Mimbres region are distinct in style and painted with geometric designs and representational images of animals, people, and cultural icons in black paint on a white background. Some of these images suggest familiarity and relationships with cultures in northern and central Mexico. The elaborate decoration suggests the Mimbres Mogollons enjoyed a rich ceremonial life. Early Mimbres black-on-white pottery, called Mimbres Style I (formerly "Boldface Black-on-White"), is primarily characterized by bold geometric designs, although some early examples feature human and animal figures.

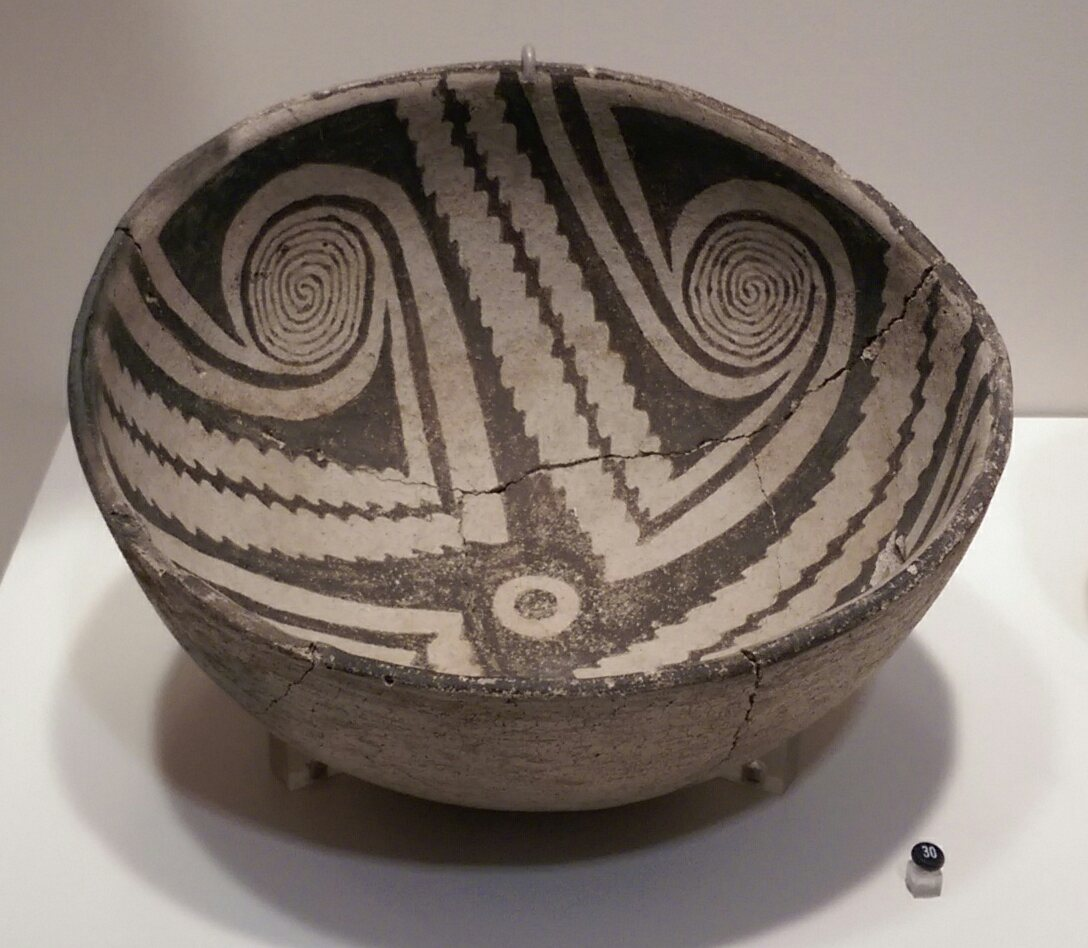
Mimbres black-on-white bowl, c. 1000–1150 CE at the California Academy of Sciences

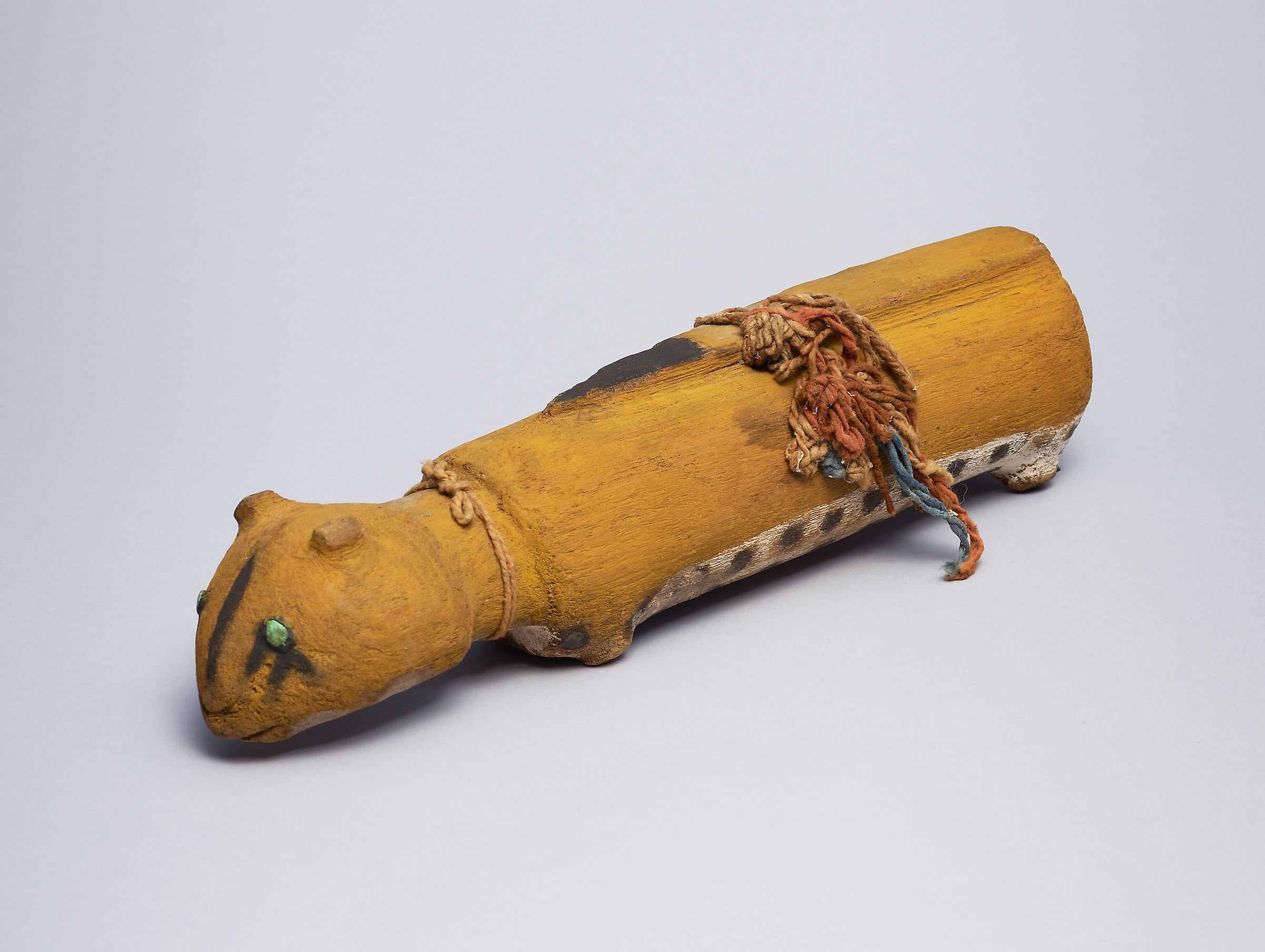
Mountain lion effigy from 1300–1400, found in a protected cave in the general Mimbres area. Note the similarity to Zuni fetishes

Both geometric and figurative designs grew increasingly sophisticated and diverse over time. Classic Mimbres Black-on-White pottery (Style III) is characterized by elaborate geometric designs, refined brushwork, including very fine linework, and may include figures of one or more animals, humans, or other images bounded either by simple rim bands or by geometric decoration. Bird figures are common on Mimbres pots, including images such as turkeys feeding on insects and a man trapping birds in a garden. Fish figures are also depicted on Mimbres pottery, and some are marine species typically found in the Gulf of California.

Mimbres bowls are often found associated with burials, typically with a hole punched out of the center, known as kill holes. Bowls with kill holes have been commonly found covering the face of the interred person. However, archaeological evidence suggests that most potteries were not buried with the dead. Wear marks on the insides of bowls show they were actually used, not just produced as burial items. The distinctive style, which includes "diamond-shaped eyes and receding chins for human figures", created demand on the black market beginning in the 1960s. Vandalism and looting of grave-sites took place and has continued into the present day.

Mimbres pottery is so distinctive that until fairly recently, the end of its production around 1130 to 1150 was equated with the "disappearance" of the people who made it. More recent research indicates that substantial depopulation did occur in the Mimbres Valley, but some remnant populations persisted there. Both there and in surrounding areas, people changed their pottery styles to more closely resemble those of neighboring culture areas, and dispersed into other residential sites with different types of architecture.

== Descendants ==
The area originally settled by the Mogollon culture was eventually filled by the unrelated Apache people, who moved in from the north. However, contemporary Pueblo people in the southwest claim descent from the Mogollon and other related cultures. Archaeologists believe that the Western Pueblo villages of the Hopi and Zuni people are potentially related to the Mogollon. Ceramics traditions and oral history link the Acoma, Hopi, and Zuni, to the Mogollon.

== See also ==
- List of dwellings of Pueblo peoples
- La Junta Indians
- Mogollon Rim
- Patayan
- Prehistoric Southwestern cultural divisions
- Swarts Ruin
- Cuarenta Casas
- Casas Grandes, or Paquimé, Chihuahua
- Gila Cliff Dwellings National Monument
- Kinishba Ruins, a National Historic Landmark in the Fort Apache Indian Reservation
