= Cuarenta Casas =

Archaeological site in the northern Mexican state of Chihuahua

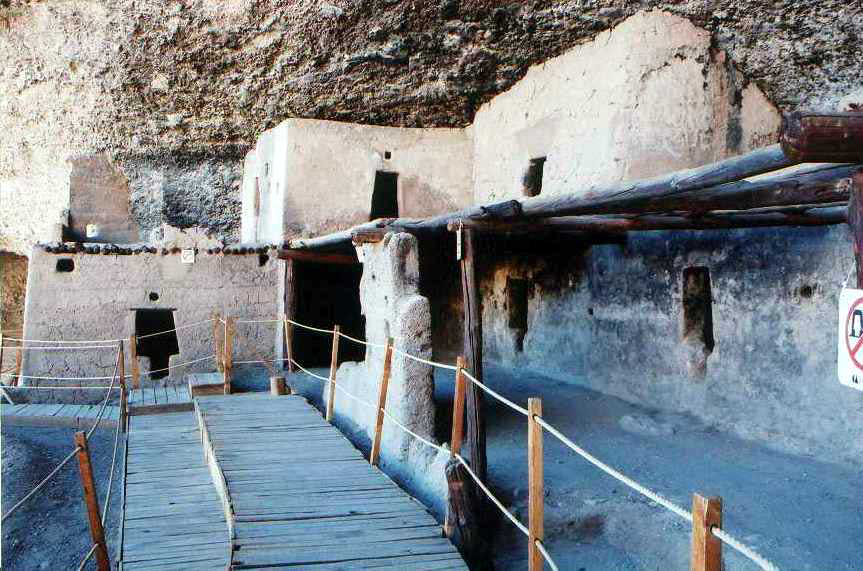
- Cuarenta Casas archaeological site
- Interactive map of Cuarenta Casas
- 29°33′12.60″N 108°10′09.30″W
- Cultures: Mogollon, Oasisamerica
- Location: Casas Grandes, Chihuahua; Mexico

History
- Built: Around 600 CE. (Paquimé Culture)
- Abandoned: Around 1350 CE

Site notes
- Website: Las Cuarenta Casas, Pagina Web INAH

Cuarenta Casas (translation: "40 houses") is an archaeological site in the northern Mexican state of Chihuahua. Construction of the site is attributed to the Mogollon culture.

Located in Vallecito in the municipality of Casas Grandes, Chihuahua, Forty Houses is believed to be the southernmost site related to the period of Mogollon influence. The site consists of a series of cliff dwellings built in natural caves in the cliffs of Huapoca Canyon. The best known is the Cueva de las Ventanas (Cave of the Windows). Early Spanish explorers named the site Cuarenta Casas (forty houses) based on their speculation of the total number of structures. The area consists of five main cave communities: Cueva del Puente, Cueva de la Serpiente, Nido del Aguila and Cueva Grande.

== The Zone ==
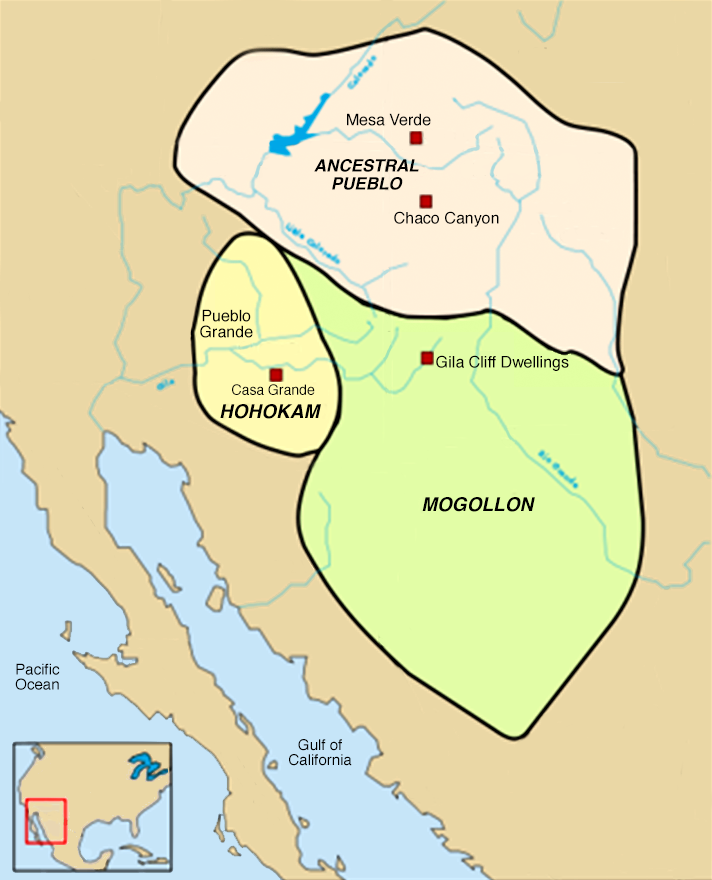
Map of major Oasisamerican cultures, circa 1350 CE

The zone is located 45 kilometers north of Ciudad Madera, Chihuahua, in the Sierra Madre Occidental, Mexico, and some 250 kilometers northwest of Chihuahua City. There are five Paquimé Culture archaeological sites in this area, accessible from the Madera municipality. These are listed below.

=== Huápoca ===
Located 36 kilometers west of Madera via a dirt road, the Ancestral Pueblo caves consist of the Serpent and the Eagle Nest. They are considered the most impressive built on cliffs. Have complete structures.

They offer wonderful views of the Huapoca Canyon.

==== Cueva de la Serpiente ====
It has 14 adobe houses, over 1,000 years old.

==== Nido del águila ====
This site has only has one house which is perched on the edge of a sheer cliff under a rocky overhang, explaining its name (Eagle's Nest).

=== Cueva Grande ===
Located 66 kilometers west of Madera, on a dirt road. Cueva Grande hides within convoluted land and behind branches of trees. The mouth of the cave is obscured by a waterfall from the top of the cave to a stream. There are two, double-story houses (800 years old) that are good examples of the native construction techniques. There is also a round grain storage area behind the structure.

=== La Ranchería ===
Cave complex, 50 kilometers south of Madera. Has an extended archaeological remain area at the base of the Sirupa canyon.

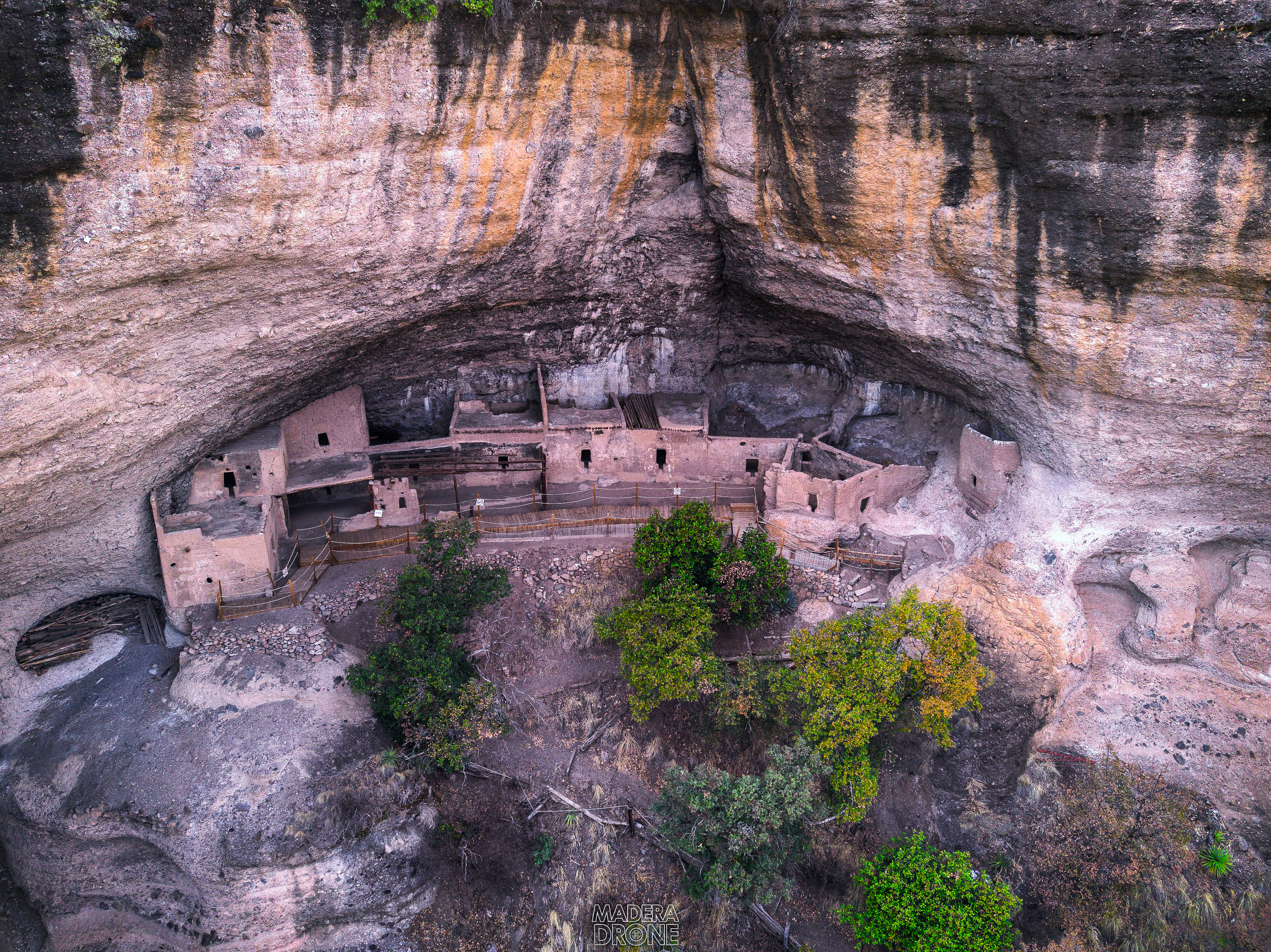
A large adobe ruin at Cuarenta Casas, 2021

=== Cueva del Puente ===
45 kilometers north of Madera

=== Cueva de Las Ventanas ===
During the early 16th century, explorer Álvar Núñez Cabeza de Vaca wrote, "And here by the side of the mountain, we forged our way inland more than 50 leagues and there found forty houses (cuarenta casas)."

== Site History ==
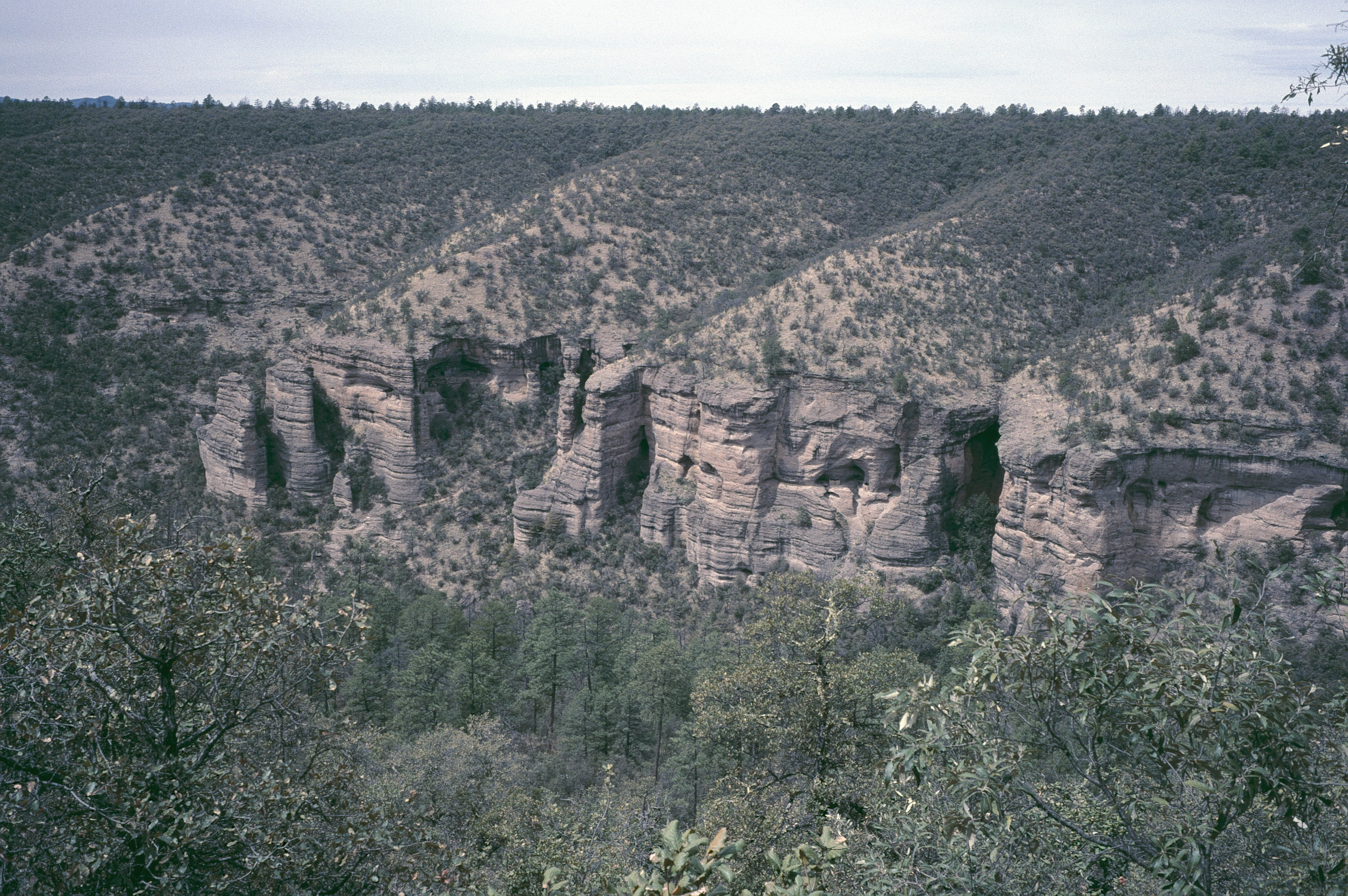
The rock wall of the canyon, the Cueva de las Ventanas cliff dwelling is located left of center above a debris-covered cone. Other ruins can be seen in other alcoves in the photo.

The current inhabitation of Chihuahua probably initiated throughout the Western Mountain Range (Sierra Madre Occidental), when native hunter-gatherer groups moved from the north looking for areas with abundant edible plants. One of those groups produced the first known evidences in the "Cueva de las Ventanas", when they still lacked the constructions we now see. As these settlers dominated agricultural techniques, gradually began occupying the margins of the rivers and originated the Paquimé culture, neighboring what today is known as Casas Grandes, Chihuahua.

Cuarentas Casas construction occurred during the height of Paquimé (Casas Grandes) (1205-1260 CE), a period corresponding to the late Mogollon culture period. Cuarentas Casas was a refuge site, similar to others at the Mesa Verde and Bandelier sites. The buildings share the typical T-shaped doorways of their northern neighbors and are constructed from adobe and rock with pine logs beams.

It is possible that Cuarenta Casas was a garrison that protected allied groups in the region, in addition to safekeeping commercial routes. It settlers farmed maize and pumpkin, their nourishment was supplemented with hunting of small species (rabbits) and harvesting of eatable wild plants like acorns, yucca seeds and maguey leaves. This was confirmed by remains found in archaeological excavations. The Paquimé regional center must have had frequent problems with hostile neighboring groups, which explains the presence of many surveillance points in extensive areas. Besieged by those groups or perhaps by internal problems, the settlement decayed, was abandoned and some of its inhabitants emigrated.

Constructions date back to that period; at that time the zone was a meeting point for native traders of the Paquimé group communicating with the Pacific Ocean and Gulf of California coasts, and to other cultural centers to the north such as Mesa Verde in Colorado and Chaco Canyon in New Mexico. The routes to the Pacific followed the Piedras Verdes River to the south and connected with the rivers that flow to the Pacific by way of smaller arroyos and canyons. Among these is the Huapoca Canyon to the west of the town of Madera. The Huapoca Canyon is not among the deepest of the Sierra Tarahumara but it possesses the most archaeological interest.

The reasons why the settlement decayed, at 1340 CE are not known. At the Paquimé fall as social and cultural center, the commercial routes disappeared, the guardians left their posts and many settlements throughout the route were abandoned. Occasionally "Cueva de las Ventanas" was briefly occupied mainly with ceremonial purposes.

As of 1520, the caves still were inhabited by native groups, hence it was possible to obtain information about their way of life, the natives named themselves "Jovas" or Cáhitas, and with that name they also referred to a group or larger family. This ethnic group is now considered extinct.

The latest occupation of Cuarenta Casas occurred during the Paquimé apogee (1205 to 1260 CE); this period corresponds to the late period of Paquimé culture.

== The Site ==
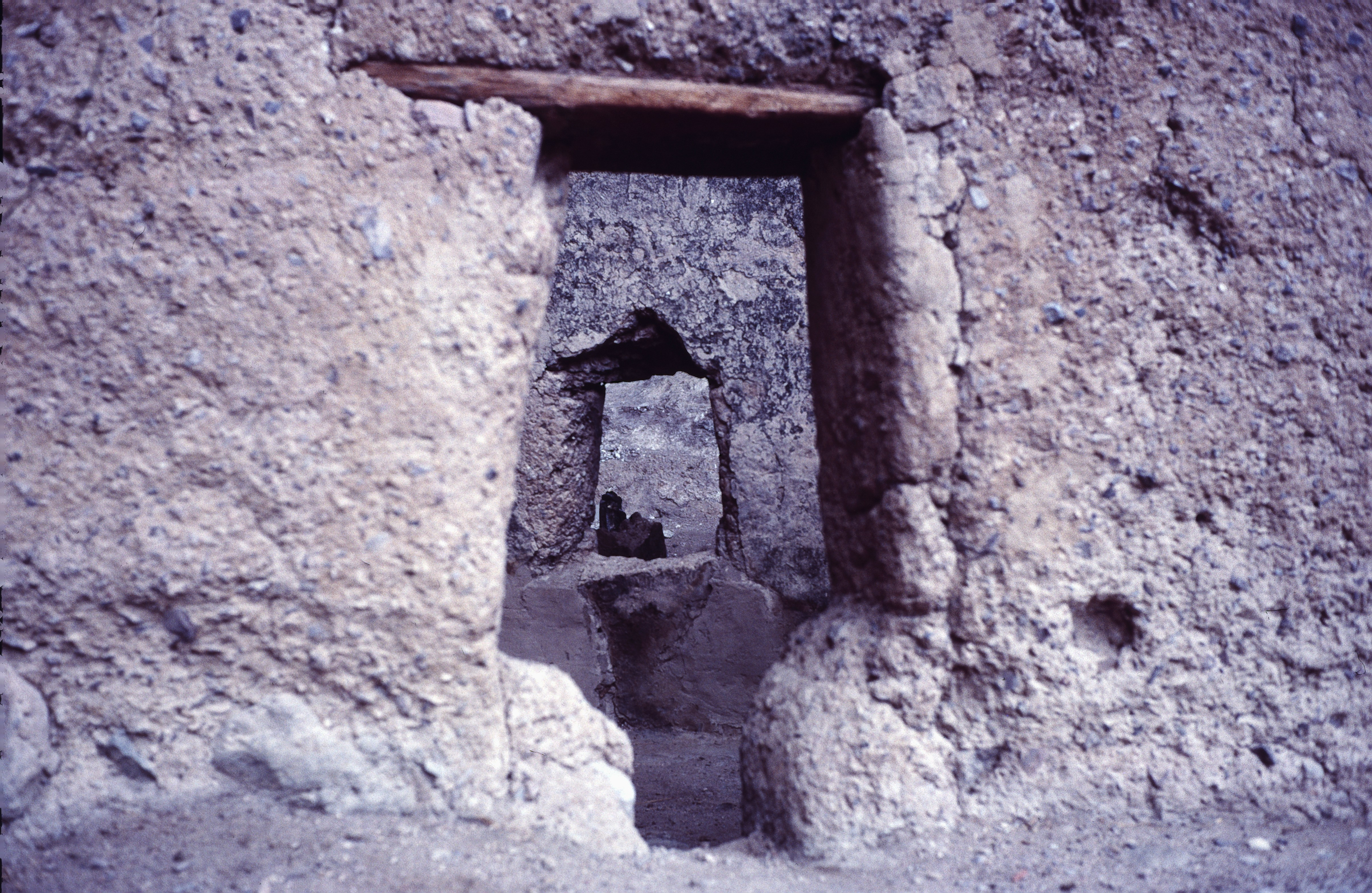
Typical T-shaped doorway

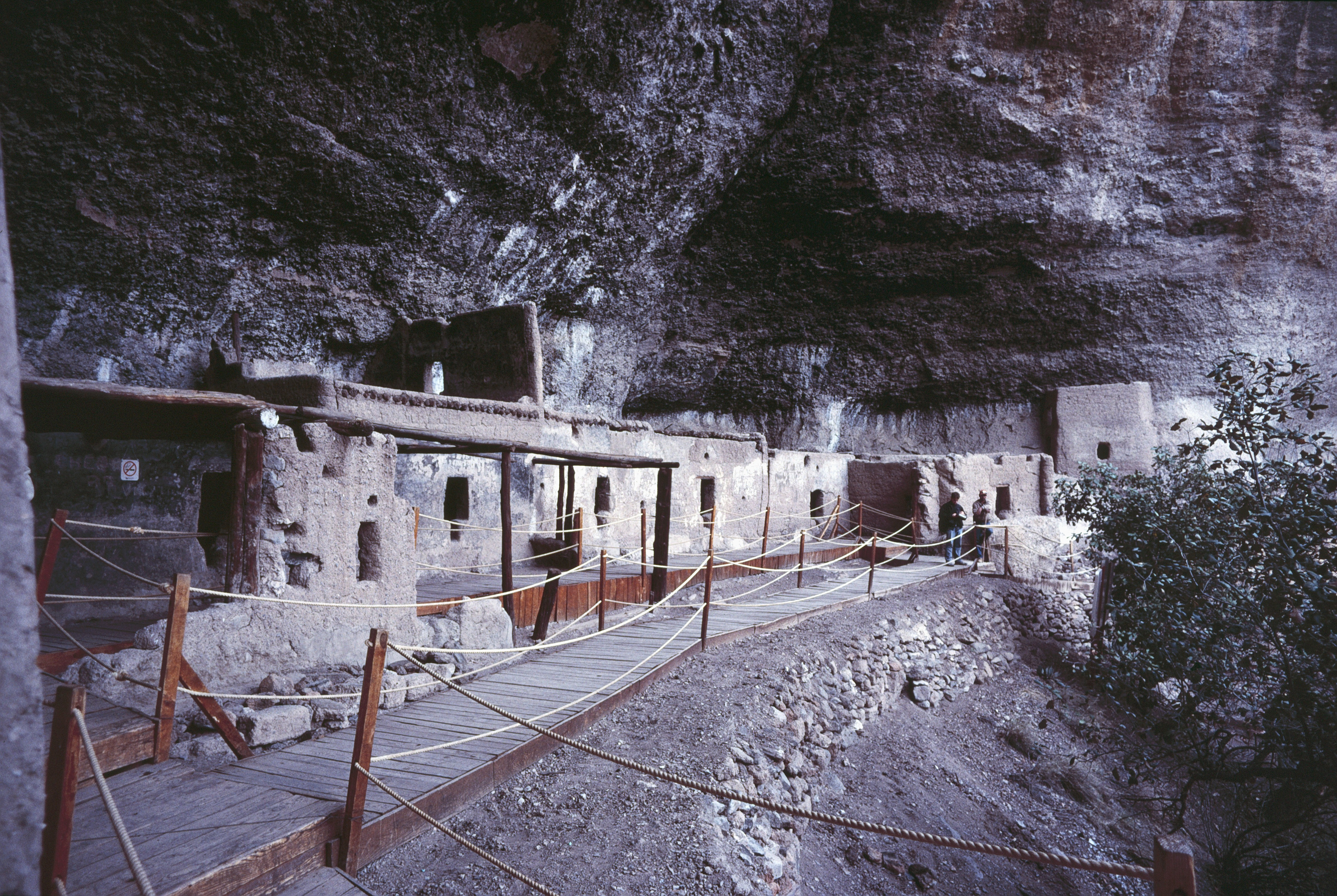
The large building in the Cueva de las Ventanas with Room 5 in the background.

Of the cave complex, the only area partially restored is the "Cueva de las Ventanas". It is a small archaeological site constructed with strong walls of poured adobe, with small "T" doors, characterizing the region pre-Hispanic architecture. It is a two-story structure of which only the ground floor rooms can be visited, these are distributed such that space was maximized within the space available in the cave.

== Cueva de las Ventanas ==
Almost all rooms had stuccoed floors and furnaces.

=== Room 1 ===
It is almost totally destroyed and was placed towards the cave slope.

=== Room 2 ===
On its higher section, a watchtower was constructed; it has a large number of small windows. It was equipped with a small drain channel and a urinal, the only ones found at the site. It is suspected it was used particularly during the crude winters of the region.

=== Room 3 ===
It is a large room, by its characteristics it must have been an area where most daily activities took place. Because of a sidewalk carved on the rock it is believed to have been used for certain ceremonies, as was done in the kivas, by southwestern US natives, from prehispanic times. This site has relevant similarities with sites of that region.

The room is partially roofed with pine beams and displays remains of windows that would perhaps complement those of the watchtower. Vestiges of a normal size door was found, all others are a meter of high. In this enclosure and almost in all other, the remains of strong floors with well finished stucco can be seen.

=== Room 4 ===
It is almost totally destroyed, it lacks ceiling, and remaining walls indicate that its size was larger than others in the cave's back, with similar functions to those of Room 3.

=== Room 5 ===
Its layout is irregular and it was built over a large rock. From old photographs of the site, it is known that its interior had an oval-shaped barn, with a kind of woven grass cover. Its overall height was two meters, currently, it is totally destroyed and it is only possible to see remains of the walls in the floor; these were reinforced with dry woven grass and covered with mud. Other similar barns have been found in like sites of the "Sierra Madre Occidental".

=== Room 6 ===
The remaining rooms were built at the end of the cave, embedded in the rocky wall and it is believed were housing units.

Number 6 is in the south side and still has its ceiling pine wood beams in good conditions. Being adjacent to rooms 3 and 7 it is very dark and cold.

=== Rooms 7 and 8 ===
Number 7 is similar to the previous one, does not have any distinguishing characteristics. Number 8 lacks a ceiling and has access to a small area that perhaps was used as an internal patio. Perhaps it was used to manufacture arrows, as a required complementary activity. Several stone tools were found, of the type used to carve and smooth the wooden materials used to make projectiles.

=== Rooms 9 and 10 ===
Both are deteriorated and 10 were probably propped up by the last inhabitants. Vestiges of small stoves were found as well as compacted earth steps that lead to the long enclosures that are to the front.

=== Room 11 ===
Basically it is similar to the previous, but for some reason native groups of similar cultures to the constructors, visited it and painted zoomorphic designs on its walls; these are streamlined figures that represent elongated birds, the beak is apparent. It is possible that these artists were the original inhabitants, which returned to celebrate some type of ritual that could not be made elsewhere.

=== Room 12 ===
An individual burial was found, perhaps a local leader, it was placed in the small space between the wall and the rock of the cave. It had a small maize offering, one ceramic pot and a leather bag with pinole, used by pre-Hispanic people of Mexico. The burial also contained, semiprecious stones, possibly currency to ensure his entrance to the underworld. The man was shrouded in a mortuary bed roll (Petate) similar those depicted in some of the pre-Hispanic codices.

=== Rooms 13 and 14 ===
Number 13 is very deteriorated and perhaps had large dimensions.

Number 14 is smaller and isolated, was constructed at the rocky bottom and because of its small dimensions it could only be used to sleep, as well as to temporarily isolate people, as per inhabitants beliefs, and as was done with young girls at the time of their first menstruation. This custom was practiced by native groups of the area, even in current times.

From this room it is possible to see the floors of the second floor rooms, although deteriorated, clay molded forms can be seen near the center of each floor; these are of rectangular shape and not too high, perhaps stoves used in the site.

== See also ==
- Hohokam
- Mogollon culture
- Oasisamerica
