= Ciudad Madera =

Town in the Mexican state of Chihuahua

Madera
- Town
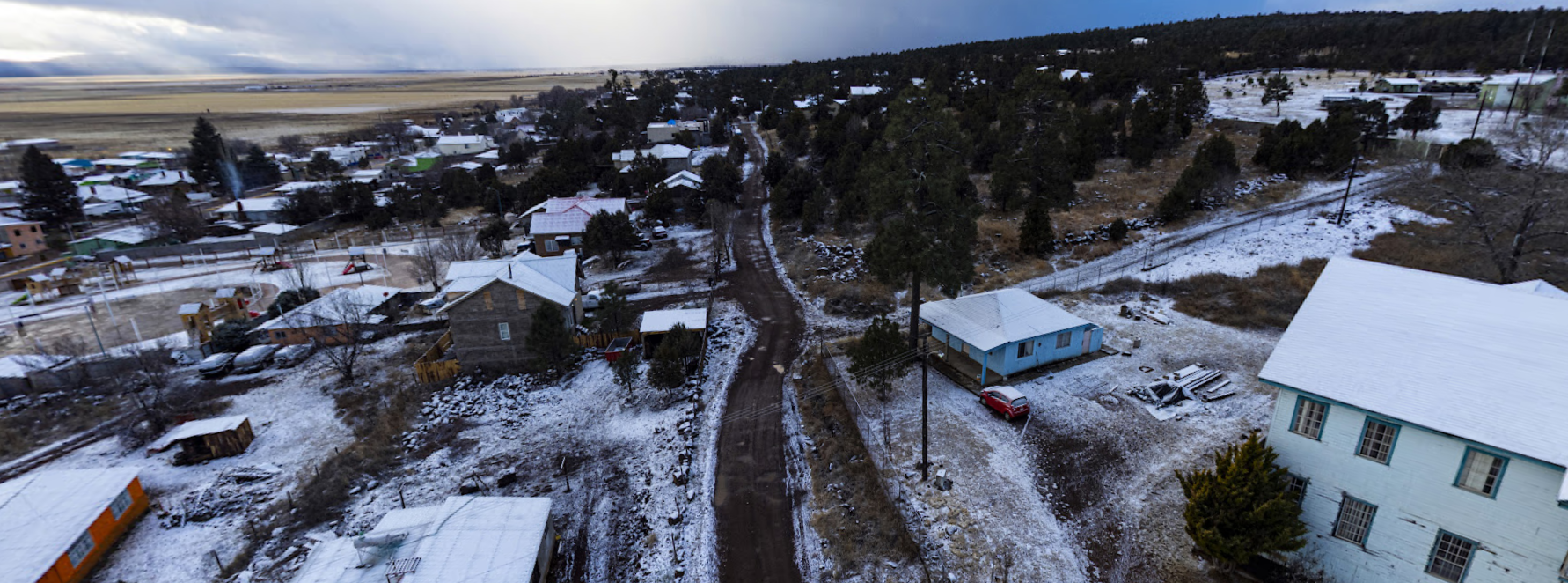

- Location in Mexico Madera (Chihuahua)
- Coordinates: 29°11′24″N 108°8′29″W
- Country: Mexico
- State: Chihuahua
- Municipality: Madera
- Elevation: 2,121 m (6,959 ft)

Population (2010)
  - Total: 15,447

Madera, also known as Ciudad Madera, is a town and seat of the municipality of Madera in the mountains of the northwestern Mexican state of Chihuahua. As of 2010, the city of Madera had a population of 15,447, up from 15,267 as of 2005.

It is a logging town, located in the mountains and the lumber industry is still very important. Madera is Spanish for "wood", and there used to be a large U.S. company with large lumber mills, there is still a section of the city called "barrio americano" where some American-style wooden houses still survive. New manufacturing industries have created new employment for the residents. It is known as the coldest place in Mexico.

It is at 2,121 metres (6,959 ft) above sea level and was founded in 1906.

The town is located 276 kilometres northwest of the state capital, Chihuahua, and 536 km southwest of Ciudad Juárez on the U.S. border.

== History ==
Madera has been the starting point of the Cabalgata Binacional Villista (see cavalcade).

Madera is also the place where on September 23, 1965, a guerrilla attack on the military took place; this gave the name to the "Liga 23 de Septiembre," an urban socialist guerrilla group that took the name to commemorate what they considered their martyrs. Chihuahua governor Práxedes Giner Durán ordered the bodies to be buried in a mass grave.

== Religion ==
From 25 April 1966 it was the seat of the Territorial Prelature of Madera; after that was promoted to Diocese of Cuauhtémoc-Madera, with a cathedral in its new see Cuauhtémoc, Madera's San Pedro church, dedicated to Saint Peter, was given the status of co-cathedral.

== Notable people ==
Manuel Torres - UFC Lightweight Fighter

== Geography ==
Madera is surrounded by the great Sierra Madre mountains (southern stretch of the Rocky Mountains in Canada and USA).

=== Climate ===
Madera’s high altitude gives it a warm-summer Mediterranean climate (Köppen climate classification: Csb) bordering with subtropical highland climate (Cfb), characterised by warm, wet summers and dry winters with cold nights. Frost occurs most mornings from October to April, but daytime temperatures rise to double digits Celsius. Snow falls on about 7 days per year on average (more often on mountain peaks).

Climate data for Madera (1991-2020)
Month	Jan	Feb	Mar	Apr	May	Jun	Jul	Aug	Sep	Oct	Nov	Dec	Year
Record high °C (°F)	24 (75)	28 (82)	29 (84)	33 (91)	37 (99)	40 (104)	39 (102)	36 (97)	34 (93)	30 (86)	28 (82)	27 (81)	40 (104)
Mean daily maximum °C (°F)	14.3 (57.7)	15.7 (60.3)	18.7 (65.7)	22.2 (72.0)	26.4 (79.5)	30.2 (86.4)	27.5 (81.5)	26.8 (80.2)	25.9 (78.6)	22.8 (73.0)	18.7 (65.7)	14.6 (58.3)	22.0 (71.6)
Daily mean °C (°F)	3.9 (39.0)	5.3 (41.5)	7.8 (46.0)	10.9 (51.6)	14.6 (58.3)	19.0 (66.2)	19.0 (66.2)	18.4 (65.1)	16.7 (62.1)	12.3 (54.1)	7.7 (45.9)	4.0 (39.2)	11.6 (52.9)
Mean daily minimum °C (°F)	−6.5 (20.3)	−5.1 (22.8)	−3.0 (26.6)	−0.4 (31.3)	2.9 (37.2)	7.9 (46.2)	10.5 (50.9)	9.9 (49.8)	7.5 (45.5)	1.7 (35.1)	−3.4 (25.9)	−6.5 (20.3)	1.3 (34.3)
Record low °C (°F)	−25 (−13)	−21 (−6)	−17 (1)	−11 (12)	−8 (18)	−4 (25)	2 (36)	1 (34)	−3 (27)	−11 (12)	−17 (1)	−25 (−13)	−25 (−13)
Average precipitation mm (inches)	39.7 (1.56)	43.1 (1.70)	19.5 (0.77)	8.9 (0.35)	8.8 (0.35)	47.6 (1.87)	157.7 (6.21)	137.3 (5.41)	79.5 (3.13)	36.8 (1.45)	31.4 (1.24)	47.2 (1.86)	657.5 (25.89)
Average precipitation days (≥ 0.1 mm)	4.4	4.1	3.0	1.5	1.9	7.9	19.8	16.5	10.0	4.4	3.3	4.3	81.1
Average snowy days (≥ 1 cm)	1.33	1.58	1.45	0.39	0	0	0	0	0	0.04	0.75	1.40	6.94
Source 1: Servicio Meteorológico Nacional
Source 2: Colegio de Postgraduados (snow days)
