= Aztec Empire =

Alliance of three Nahua city states in Mexico (1428–1521)

Triple Alliance Ēxcān Tlahtōlōyān
- 1428–1521
- Ruler city-states glyphs appeared in Codex Mendoza: Texcoco, Tenochtitlan and Tlacopan

- Maximum territorial extent in the early 16th century
- Capital: Mexico-Tenochtitlan (de facto); 19°26′N 99°8′W
- Common languages: Classical Nahuatl (lingua franca) many others
- Religion: Aztec religion
- Demonyms: Aztec, Tenochcan, Culhua-Mexica
- Government: Hegemonic confederation
- Huehuetlatoani of Tenochtitlan
  - 1427–1440: Itzcoatl (Alliance founder)
  - 1520–1521: Cuauhtémoc (last)
- Huetlatoani of Tetzcoco
  - 1431–1440: Nezahualcoyotl (Alliance founder)
  - 1516–1520: Cacamatzin (last)
- Huetlatoani of Tlacopan
  - 1400–1430: Totoquihuaztli I (Alliance founder)
  - 1519–1524: Tetlepanquetzaltin (last)
- Historical era: Pre-Columbian era Age of Discovery
  - Foundation of the alliance: 1428
  - Spanish conquest: 13 August 1521

Area
- 1520: 220,000 km^{2} (85,000 sq mi)

Population
  - Early 16th century: 6 million
- Currency: Quachtli commodity money system by cotton cloth quantity and traditionally also cocoa beans
Preceded by
Tenochtitlan
Tlatelolco
Tlacopan
Azcapotzalco
Colhuacan
Tetzcoco
Chalco
Xochimilco
Xoconochco
Coixtlahuaca
Succeeded by
New Spain
- Today part of: Mexico
- Full list of monarchs near bottom of page.

The Aztec Empire, also known as the Triple Alliance (Classical Nahuatl: Ēxcān Tlahtōlōyān, [ˈjéːʃkaːn̥ t͡ɬaʔtoːˈlóːjaːn̥]) or historiographically as the Tenochca Empire but most accurately known as the Mexica, was an alliance of three Nahua city-states: Mexico-Tenochtitlan, Tetzcoco, and Tlacopan. These three city-states ruled that area in and around the Valley of Mexico from 1428 until the combined forces of the Spanish conquistadores and their native allies who ruled under Hernán Cortés defeated them in 1521. Its people and civil society are historiographically referred to as the Aztecs or the Culhua-Mexica.

The alliance was formed from the victorious factions of a civil war fought between the city of Azcapotzalco and its former tributary provinces. Despite the initial conception of the empire as an alliance of three self-governed city-states, the capital Tenochtitlan became dominant militarily. By the time the Spanish arrived in 1519, the lands of the alliance were effectively ruled from Tenochtitlan, while other partners of the alliance had taken subsidiary roles.

The alliance waged wars of conquest and expanded after its formation. The alliance controlled most of central Mexico at its height, as well as some more distant territories within Mesoamerica, such as the Xoconochco province, an Aztec exclave near the present-day Guatemalan border. Aztec rule has been described as hegemonic or indirect. The Aztecs left rulers of conquered cities in power so long as they agreed to pay semi-annual tribute to the alliance, as well as supply military forces when needed for the Aztec war efforts. In return, the imperial authority offered protection and political stability and facilitated an integrated economic network of diverse lands and peoples who had significant local autonomy.

Aztec religion was a monistic pantheism in which the Nahua concept of teotl was construed as the supreme god Ometeotl, as well as a diverse pantheon of lesser gods and manifestations of nature. The popular religion tended to embrace the mythological and polytheistic aspects, and the empire's state religion sponsored both the monism of the upper classes and the popular heterodoxies. The empire even officially recognized the largest cults such that the deity was represented in the central temple precinct of the capital Tenochtitlan. The imperial cult was specifically that of the distinctive warlike patron god of the Mexica Huītzilōpōchtli. Peoples were allowed to retain and freely continue their own religious traditions in conquered provinces so long as they added the imperial god Huītzilōpōchtli to their local pantheons.

== Etymology and definitions ==
The word Aztec in modern usage would not have been used by the people themselves. It has variously been used to refer to the Aztecs or Triple Alliance, the Nahuatl-speaking people of central Mexico prior to the Spanish conquest, or specifically the Mexica ethnicity of the Nahuatl-speaking tribes (from tlaca). The name comes from the singular Nahuatl word aztecatl (Nahuatl pronunciation: [asˈtekat͡ɬ]) that means "[people] from Aztlan", reflecting the mythical place of origin for Nahua peoples.

== History ==
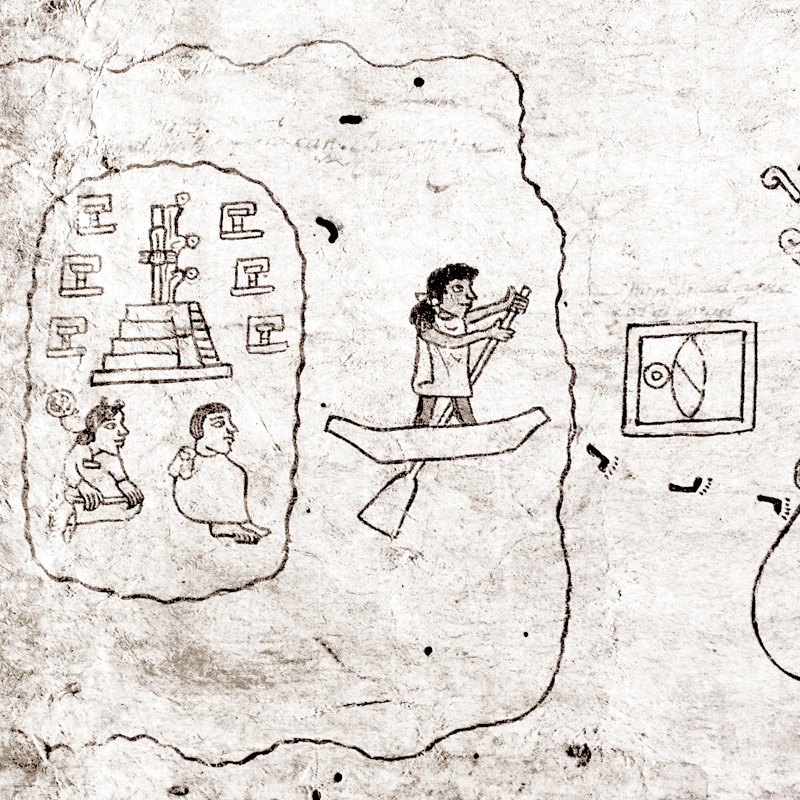
First page of the Codex Boturini, showing the migration of the Mexica.

=== Before the Aztec Empire ===
Nahua peoples descended from Chichimec peoples, who migrated to central Mexico from the north (mainly centered sparsely around present-day states of Zacatecas, San Luis Potosí, and Guanajuato) in the early 13th century. The migration story of the Mexica is similar to those of other polities in central Mexico, with supernatural sites, individuals, and events, joining earthly and divine history, as they sought political legitimacy. Pictographic codices in which the Aztecs recorded their history say that the empire's place of origin was called Aztlán. Early migrants settled the Basin of Mexico and surrounding lands by establishing a series of independent city-states. These early Nahua city-states or altepetl were ruled by dynastic heads called tlahtohqueh (singularly tlatoāni). Most of the existing settlements had been established by other indigenous peoples before the Mexica migration.

These early city-states fought various small-scale wars with each other but no individual city gained dominance due to shifting alliances. The Mexica were the last of the Nahua migrants to arrive in Central Mexico. They entered the Basin of Mexico around the year 1250, and, by then, most of the good agricultural land had already been claimed. The Mexica persuaded the king of Culhuacan, a small city-state but important historically as a refuge of the Toltecs to make them settle in a relatively infertile patch of land called Chapultepec (Chapoltepēc, "in the hill of grasshoppers"). The Mexica served as mercenaries for Culhuacan.

After the Mexica served Culhuacan in battle, the ruler appointed one of his daughters to rule over the Mexica. Mythological native accounts say that the Mexica instead sacrificed her by flaying her skin on the command of their god Xipe Totec. The ruler of Culhuacan attacked and used his army to drive the Mexica from Tizaapan by force when he learned of this. The Mexica moved to an island in the middle of Lake Texcoco where an eagle nested on a nopal cactus. The Mexica interpreted this as a sign from their gods and founded their new city Tenochtitlan on this island in the year ōme calli (or "Two House", 1325 AD).

=== Aztec warfare ===
The Mexica entered the Valley of Mexico as outsiders with limited resources, making military service one of the few ways they could secure protection and establish political relevance among stronger neighboring powers. Early in their history, the Mexica fought as subordinate allies of more powerful city-states, rising to prominence as fierce warriors and establishing themselves as a military power. The importance of warriors and the integral nature of warfare in Mexica political and religious life helped propel them to military dominance in the region.

The new Mexica city-state allied with the city of Azcapotzalco and paid tribute to its ruler Tezozomoc. Azcapotzalco began to expand into a small tributary empire with Mexica assistance. The Mexica ruler was not recognized as a legitimate king until this point. Mexica leaders successfully petitioned one of the kings of Culhuacan to provide a daughter to marry into the Mexica line. Their son Acamapichtli was enthroned as the first tlatoani of Tenochtitlan in 1372.

The Tepanecs of Azcapotzalco expanded their rule with help from the Mexica, while the Acolhua city of Texcoco grew in power in the eastern portion of the lake basin. Eventually, war erupted between the two states, and the Mexica played a vital role in the conquest of Texcoco. By then, Tenochtitlan had grown into a major city and was rewarded for its loyalty to the Tepanecs by receiving Texcoco as a tributary province.

Mexica warfare was marked by a focus on capturing enemies rather than killing them. Capturing enemies alive was significant because prisoners supplied the sacrificial rituals that the Mexica believed were necessary to sustain divine favor. Military achievement, in other words, was linked to sacred responsibility. Captives provided a means by which soldiers could distinguish themselves during campaigns and elevate their standing within the Mexica social hierarchy. That being said, battles were not limited to ritual purposes and could involve significant killing.

=== Tepanec War ===
In 1426, the Tepanec king Tezozomoc died, and the resulting succession crisis precipitated a civil war between potential successors. The Mexica supported Tezozomoc's preferred heir Tayahauh, who was initially enthroned as king. But his son Maxtla soon usurped the throne and turned against factions that opposed him, including the Mexica ruler Chimalpopoca. The latter died shortly thereafter, possibly assassinated by Maxtla.

The new Mexica ruler Itzcoatl continued to defy Maxtla, and he blockaded Tenochtitlan and demanded increased tribute payments. Maxtla similarly turned against the Acolhua, and the king of Texcoco Nezahualcoyotl fled into exile. Nezahualcoyotl recruited military help from the king of Huexotzinco, and the Mexica gained the support of a dissident Tepanec city called Tlacopan. In 1427, Tenochtitlan, Texcoco, Tlacopan, and Huexotzinco went to war against Azcapotzalco, emerging victorious in 1428.

After the war, Huexotzinco withdrew, and, in 1430, the three remaining cities formed a treaty now known as the Triple Alliance. The Tepanec lands were carved up among the three cities, whose leaders agreed to cooperate in future wars of conquest. Land acquired from these conquests was to be held by the three cities together. A tribute was divided so that two kings of the alliance would go to Tenochtitlan and Texcoco and one would go to Tlacopan. The three kings assumed the title "huetlatoani" ("Elder Speaker", often translated as "Emperor") in turn. Each temporarily held a de jure position above the rulers of other city-states ("tlatoani") in this role.

In the following one hundred years, the Triple Alliance of Tenochtitlan, Texcoco, and Tlacopan dominated the Valley of Mexico and extended its power to the shores of the Gulf of Mexico and the Pacific Ocean. Tenochtitlan gradually became the dominant power in the alliance. Two of the primary architects of this alliance were the half-brothers and nephews of Itzcoatl Tlacaelel and Moctezuma. Moctezuma eventually succeeded Itzcoatl as the Mexica huetlatoani in 1440. Tlacaelel occupied the newly created "Cihuacoatl" title, equivalent to something between "Prime Minister" and "Viceroy".

=== Imperial reforms ===
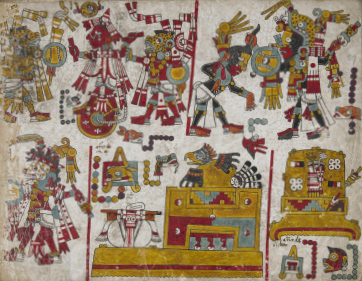
Jaguar warriors in a flower war from the Codex Zouche-Nuttall

Shortly after the formation of the Triple Alliance, Itzcoatl and Tlacopan instigated sweeping reforms on the Aztec state and religion. It has been alleged that Tlacaelel ordered the burning of some or most of the extant Aztec books, claiming that they contained lies and that it was "not wise that all the people should know the paintings". He rewrote the history of the Aztecs thereafter, naturally placing the Mexica in a more central role.

After Moctezuma I succeeded Itzcoatl as the Mexica emperor, more reforms were instigated to maintain control over conquered cities. Uncooperative kings were replaced with puppet rulers loyal to the Mexica. A new imperial tribute system established Mexica tribute collectors that taxed the population directly, bypassing the authority of local dynasties. Nezahualcoyotl also instituted a policy in the Acolhua lands of granting subject kings tributary holdings in lands far from their capitals. This was done to create an incentive for cooperation with the empire; if a city's king rebelled, he lost the tribute he received from foreign land. Some rebellious kings were replaced by calpixqueh or appointed governors rather than dynastic rulers.

Moctezuma issued new laws that separated nobles from commoners and instituted the death penalty for adultery and other offenses. A religiously supervised school was built in every neighborhood by royal decree. Commoner neighborhoods had a school called a "telpochcalli" where they received basic religious instruction and military training. A second, more prestigious type of school called a "calmecac" served to teach the nobility, as well as commoners of high standing seeking to become priests or artisans. Moctezuma also created a new title called "quauhpilli" that could be conferred on commoners. This title was a form of non-hereditary lesser nobility awarded for outstanding military or civil service (similar to the English knight). Commoners who received this title rarely married into royal families and became kings.

One component of this reform was the creation of an institution of regulated warfare called the Flower Wars. Mesoamerican warfare overall is characterized by a strong preference for capturing live prisoners as opposed to slaughtering the enemy on the battlefield, which was considered sloppy and gratuitous. The Flower Wars are a potent manifestation of this approach to warfare. These highly ritualized wars ensured a steady, healthy supply of experienced Aztec warriors as well as a steady, healthy supply of captured enemy warriors for sacrifice to the gods. Flower wars were pre-arranged by officials on both sides and conducted specifically for the purpose of each polity collecting prisoners for sacrifice. Native historical accounts say that these wars were instigated by Tlacaelel as a means of appeasing the gods in response to a massive drought that gripped the Basin of Mexico from 1450 to 1454. The flower wars were mostly waged between the Aztec Empire and the neighboring cities of their arch-enemy Tlaxcala.

=== Early years of expansion ===
After the defeat of the Tepanecs, Itzcoatl and Nezahualcoyotl consolidated power in the Basin of Mexico and began to expand beyond its borders. The first targets for imperial expansion were Coyoacan in the Basin of Mexico and Cuauhnahuac and Huaxtepec in the modern Mexican state of Morelos. These conquests provided the new empire with a large influx of tribute, especially agricultural goods.

Itzcoatl died, and Moctezuma I was enthroned as the new Mexica emperor. The expansion of the empire was briefly halted by a major four-year drought that hit the Basin of Mexico in 1450, and several cities in Morelos had to be re-conquered after the drought subsided. Moctezuma and Nezahualcoyotl continued to expand the empire east towards the Gulf of Mexico and south into Oaxaca. In 1468, Moctezuma I died and was succeeded by his son Axayacatl. Most of Axayacatl's thirteen-year reign was spent consolidating the territory acquired under his predecessor. Motecuzoma and Nezahualcoyotl had expanded rapidly and many provinces rebelled.

Also, as the Aztec Empire was expanding and consolidating power, the Purépecha Empire in West Mexico was similarly expanding. In 1455, the Purépecha under their king Tzitzipandaquare had invaded the Toluca Valley, claiming lands previously conquered by Motecuzoma and Itzcoatl. In 1472, Axayacatl re-conquered the region and successfully defended it from Purépecha's attempts to take it back. In 1479, Axayacatl launched a major invasion of the Purépecha Empire with 32,000 Aztec soldiers. Purépecha met them just across the border with 50,000 soldiers and scored a resounding victory, killing or capturing over 90% of the Aztec army. Axayacatl himself was wounded in the battle, retreated to Tenochtitlan, and never engaged the Purépecha in battle again.

In 1472, Nezahualcoyotl died, and his son Nezahualpilli was enthroned as the new huetlatoani of Texcoco. This was followed by the death of Axayacatl in 1481. Axayacatl was replaced by his brother Tizoc. Tizoc's reign was notoriously brief. He proved to be ineffectual and did not significantly expand the empire. Tizoc was likely assassinated by his own nobles five years into his rule, apparently due to his incompetence.

=== Later years of expansion ===
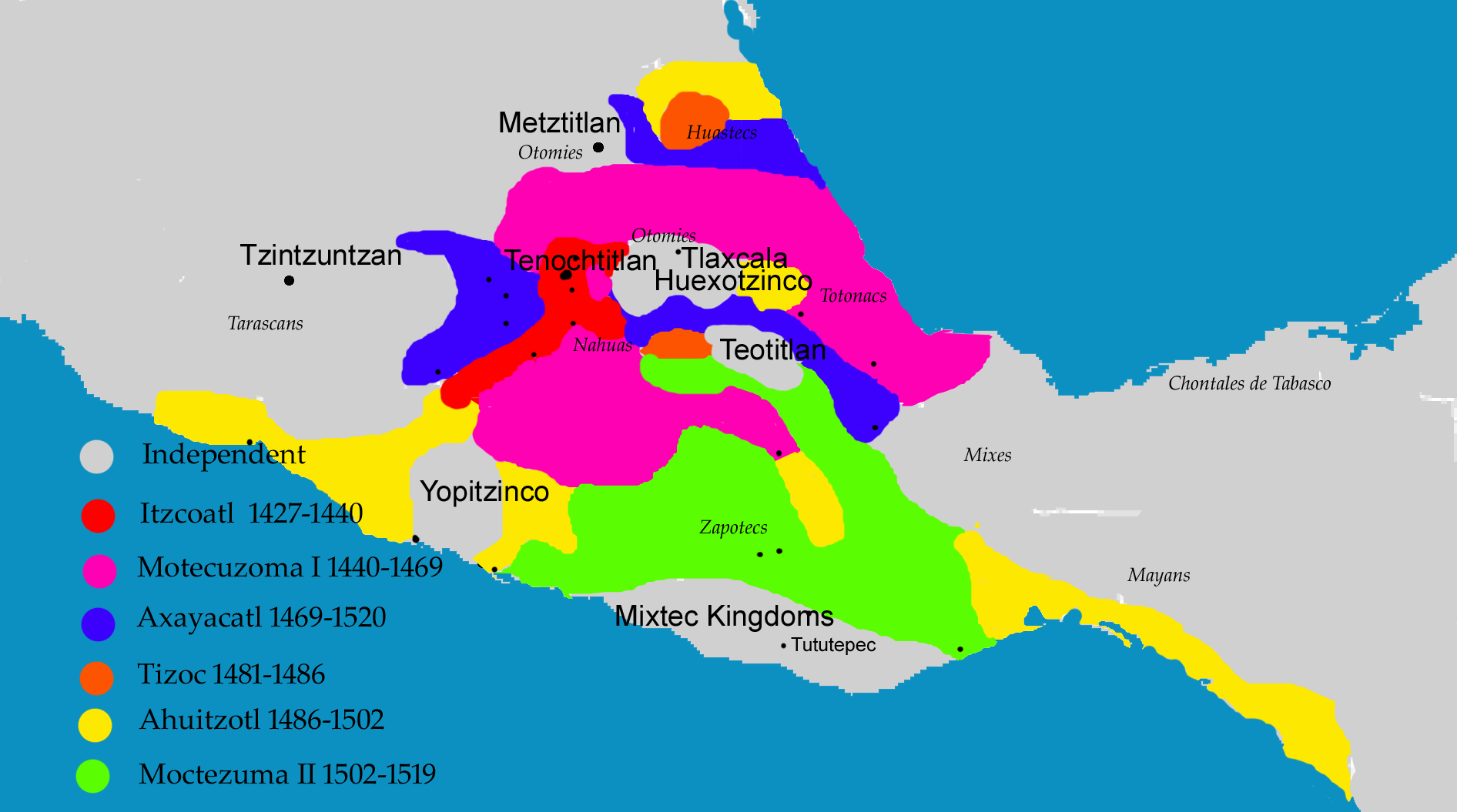
Map of the expansion of the empire, showing the areas that have been conquered by the Aztec rulers.

Tizoc was succeeded by his brother Ahuitzotl in 1486. Like his predecessors, the first part of Ahuitzotl's reign was spent suppressing rebellions that were commonplace due to the indirect nature of Aztec rule. Ahuitzotl then began a new wave of conquests including the Oaxaca Valley and the Soconusco Coast. Ahuitzotl conquered the border city of Otzoma and turned the city into a military outpost due to increased border skirmishes with the Purépecha. The population of Otzoma was either killed or dispersed in the process. The Purépecha subsequently established fortresses nearby to protect against Aztec expansion. Ahuitzotl responded by expanding further west to the Pacific Coast of Guerrero.

By the reign of Ahuitzotl, the Mexica were the largest and most powerful faction in the Aztec Triple Alliance. Building on the prestige the Mexica had acquired over the course of the conquests, Ahuitzotl began to use the title "huehuetlatoani" ("Eldest Speaker") to distinguish himself from the rulers of Texcoco and Tlacopan. The alliance still technically ran the empire. But the Mexica Emperor now assumed nominal if not actual seniority.

Ahuitzotl was succeeded by his nephew Moctezuma II in 1502. Moctezuma II spent most of his reign consolidating power in lands conquered by his predecessors. In 1515, Aztec armies commanded by the Tlaxcalan general Tlahuicole invaded the Purépecha Empire once again. The Aztec army failed to take any territory and was mostly restricted to raiding. The Purépecha defeated them and the army withdrew.

Moctezuma II instituted more imperial reforms. The death of Nezahualcoyotl caused the Mexica Emperors to become the de facto rulers of the alliance. Moctezuma II used his reign to attempt to consolidate power more closely with the Mexica Emperor. He removed many of Ahuitzotl's advisors and had several of them executed. He also abolished the quauhpilli class, destroying the chance for commoners to advance to the nobility. His reform efforts were cut short by the Spanish conquest in 1519.

=== Spanish conquest ===
The Valley of Mexico at the time of the Spanish conquest

The Spanish expedition leader Hernán Cortés landed in Yucatán in 1519 with approximately 630 men (most armed with only a sword and shield). Cortés had actually been removed as the expedition's commander by the governor of Cuba Diego Velásquez but had stolen the boats and left without permission. At the island of Cozumel, Cortés encountered a shipwrecked Spaniard named Gerónimo de Aguilar who joined the expedition and translated between Spanish and Mayan. The expedition then sailed west to Campeche, where, after a brief battle with the local army, Cortés was able to negotiate peace through his interpreter Aguilar. The King of Campeche gave Cortés a second translator, a bilingual Nahua-Maya slave woman named La Malinche (she was known also as Malinalli [maliˈnalːi], Malintzin [maˈlintsin] or Doña Marina [ˈdoɲa maˈɾina]). Aguilar translated from Spanish to Mayan, and La Malinche translated from Mayan to Nahuatl. Malinche became Cortés' translator for both language and culture once she learned Spanish, and she was a key figure in interactions with Nahua rulers.

Cortés then sailed from Campeche to Cempoala, a tributary province of the Aztec Triple Alliance. Nearby, he founded the town of Veracruz where he met with ambassadors from the reigning Mexica emperor Moctezuma II. When the ambassadors returned to Tenochtitlan, Cortés went to Cempoala to meet with the local Totonac leaders. The Totonac ruler told Cortés of his various grievances against the Mexica, and Cortés convinced the Totonacs to imprison an imperial tribute collector. Cortés subsequently released the tribute collector after persuading him that the move was entirely the Totonac's idea and that he had no knowledge of it. The Totonacs provided Cortés with 20 companies of soldiers for his march to Tlaxcala, having effectively declared war on the Aztecs. At this time, several of Cortés' soldiers attempted to mutiny. When Cortés discovered the plot, he had his ships scuttled and sank them in the harbor to remove any possibility of escaping to Cuba.

The maximal extent of the Aztec Empire by 1519, according to María del Carmen Solanes Carraro and Enrique Vela Ramírez.

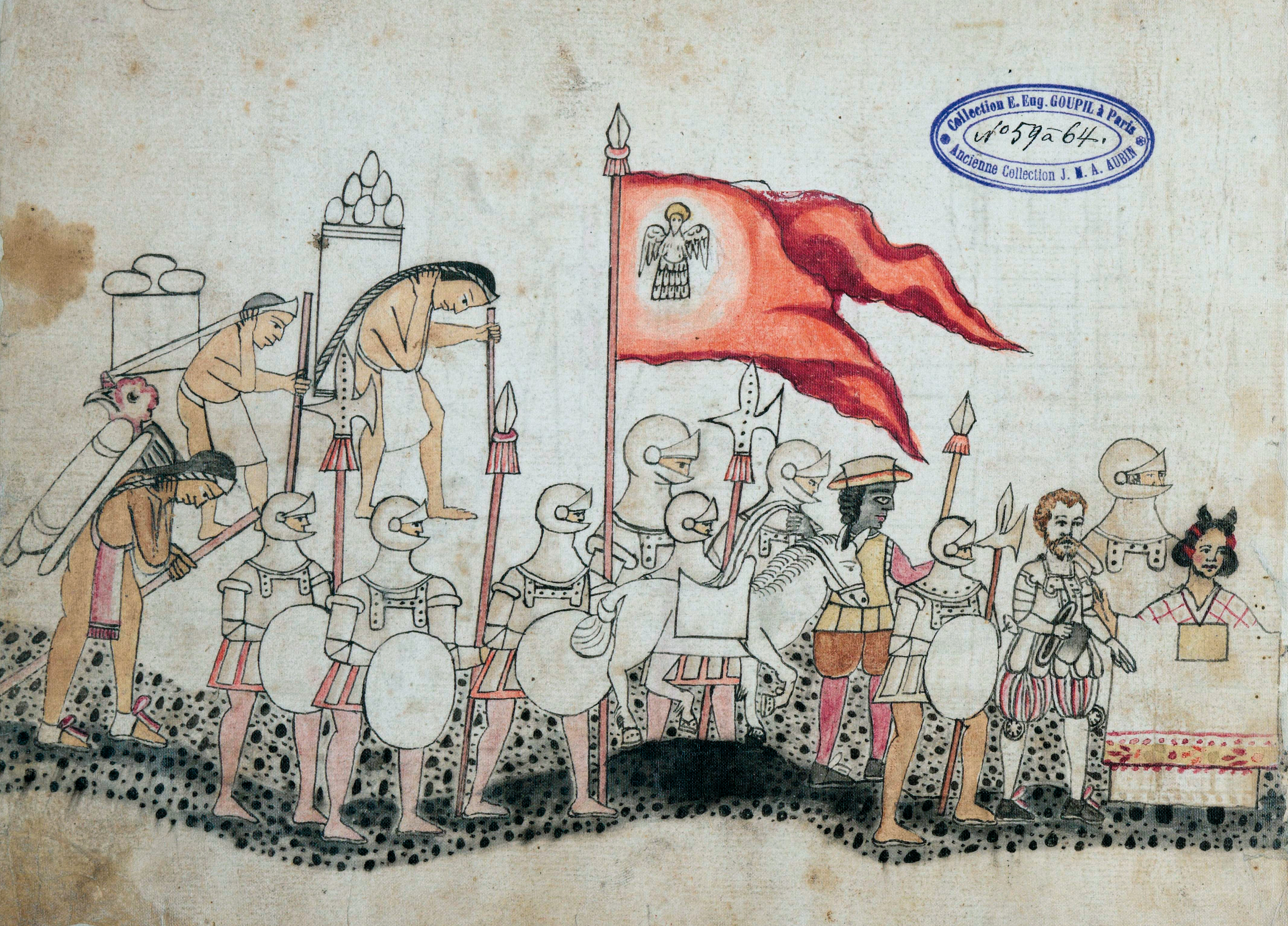
Codex Azcatitlan depicting the Spanish army, with Cortés and Malinche in front

The Spanish-led Totonac army crossed into Tlaxcala to seek the latter's alliance against the Aztecs. However, the Tlaxcalan general Xicotencatl the Younger believed them to be hostile and attacked. After fighting several close battles, Cortés eventually convinced the leaders of Tlaxcala to order their general to stand down. Cortés then secured an alliance with the people of Tlaxcala and traveled from there to the Basin of Mexico with a smaller company of 5,000-6,000 Tlaxcalans and 400 Totonacs in addition to the Spanish soldiers. During his stay in the city of Cholula, Cortés claims he received word of a planned ambush against the Spanish. In a pre-emptive response, Cortés directed his troops to attack and kill a large amount of unarmed Cholulans gathered in the main square of the city.

Following the massacre at Cholula, Cortés and the other Spaniards entered Tenochtitlan, where they were greeted as guests and given quarters in the palace of former emperor Axayacatl. After staying in the city for six weeks, two Spaniards from the group left behind in Veracruz were killed in an altercation with an Aztec lord named Quetzalpopoca. Cortés claims that he used this incident as an excuse to take Motecuzoma prisoner under threat of force. Motecuzoma continued to run the kingdom as a prisoner of Cortés for several months. A second, larger Spanish expedition then arrived in 1520 under the command of Pánfilo de Narváez sent by Diego Velásquez with the goal of arresting Cortés for treason. Before confronting Narváez, Cortés secretly persuaded Narváez's lieutenants to betray him and join Cortés.

Cortés was away from Tenochtitlan dealing with Narváez, while his second-in-command Pedro de Alvarado massacred a group of Aztec nobility, in response to a ritual of human sacrifice honoring Huitzilopochtli. The Aztecs retaliated by attacking the palace where the Spanish were quartered. Cortés returned to Tenochtitlan and fought his way to the palace. He then took Motecuzoma up to the roof of the palace to ask his subjects to stand down. However, by this point, the ruling council of Tenochtitlan had voted to depose Motecuzoma and had elected his brother Cuitlahuac as the new emperor. One of the Aztec soldiers struck Motecuzoma in the head with a sling stone, and he died several days later, though the exact circumstances of his death are unclear.

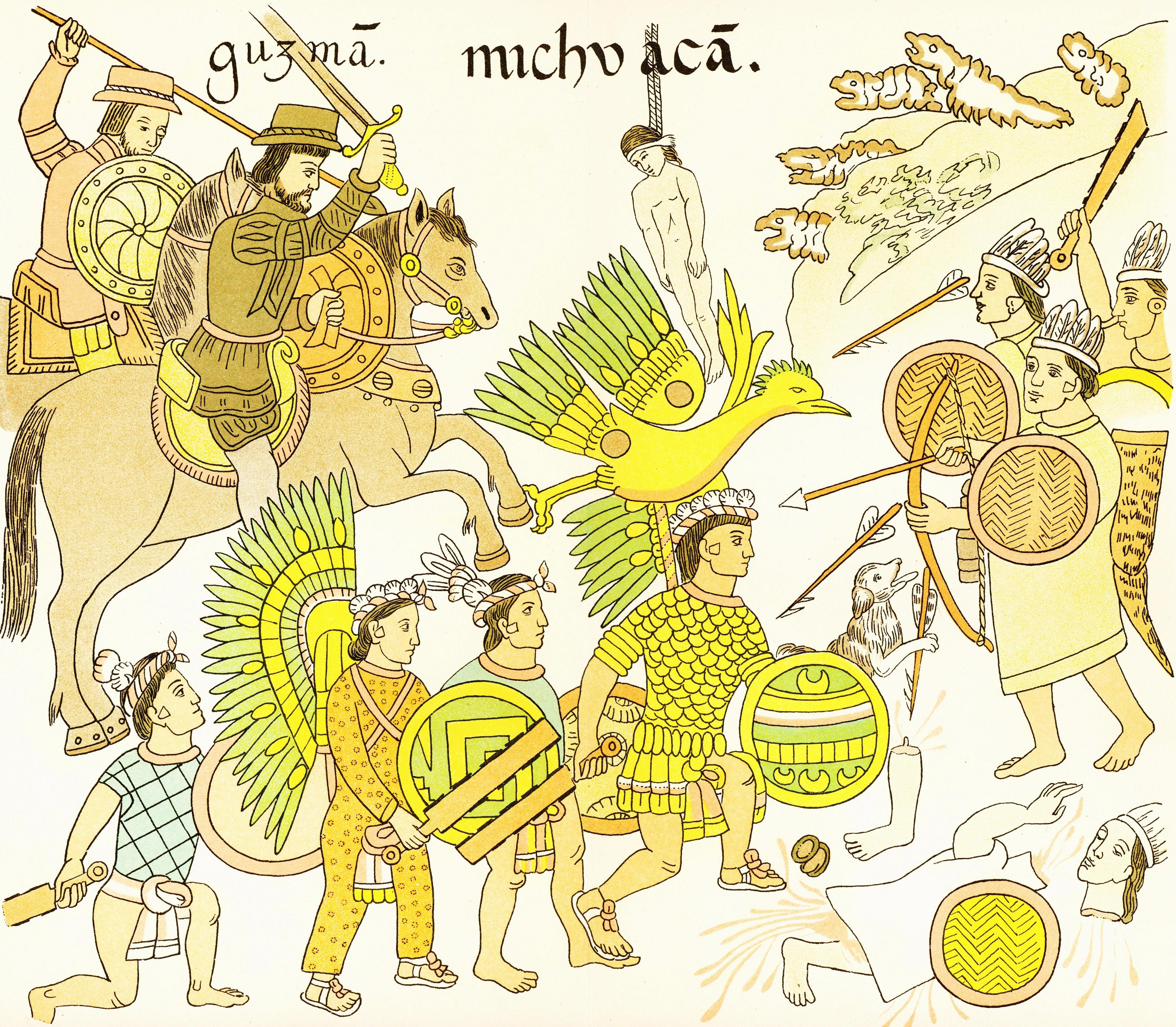
Cristóbal de Olid led Spanish soldiers with Tlaxcalan allies in the conquests of Jalisco and Colima of West Mexico.

The Spaniards and their allies attempted to retreat without detection in what is known as the "Sad Night" or La Noche Triste, realizing that they were vulnerable to the hostile Mexica in Tenochtitlan following Moctezuma's death. Spaniards and their Indigenous allies were discovered clandestinely retreating and were then forced to fight their way out of the city with heavy loss of life. Some Spaniards lost their lives by drowning, loaded down with gold. They retreated to Tlacopan (now Tacuba) and made their way to Tlaxcala where they recovered and prepared for the second, successful assault on Tenochtitlan. After this incident, a smallpox outbreak hit Tenochtitlan. The outbreak alone killed more than 50% of the region's population, including the emperor Cuitláhuac, as the indigenous of the New World had no previous exposure to smallpox. The new emperor Cuauhtémoc dealt with the smallpox outbreak, while Cortés raised an army of Tlaxcalans, Texcocans, Totonacs, and others discontent with Aztec rule. Cortés marched back to the Basin of Mexico with a combined army of up to 100,000 warriors. The overwhelming majority of warriors were indigenous rather than Spanish. Cortés captured various indigenous city-states or altepetl around the lake shore and surrounding mountains through numerous subsequent battles and skirmishes, including the other capitals of the Triple Alliance, Tlacopan and Texcoco. Texcoco, in fact, had already become firm allies of the Spaniards and the city-state and subsequently petitioned the Spanish crown for recognition of their services in the conquest similar to Tlaxcala.

Cortés used boats constructed in Texcoco from parts salvaged from the scuttled ships to blockade and lay siege to Tenochtitlan for a period of several months. Eventually, the Spanish-led army assaulted the city both by boat and using the elevated causeways connecting it to the mainland. The attackers took heavy casualties, although the Aztecs were ultimately defeated. The city of Tenochtitlan was thoroughly destroyed in the process. Cuauhtémoc was captured as he attempted to flee the city. Cortés kept him prisoner and tortured him for a period of several years before finally executing him in 1525.

== Government ==
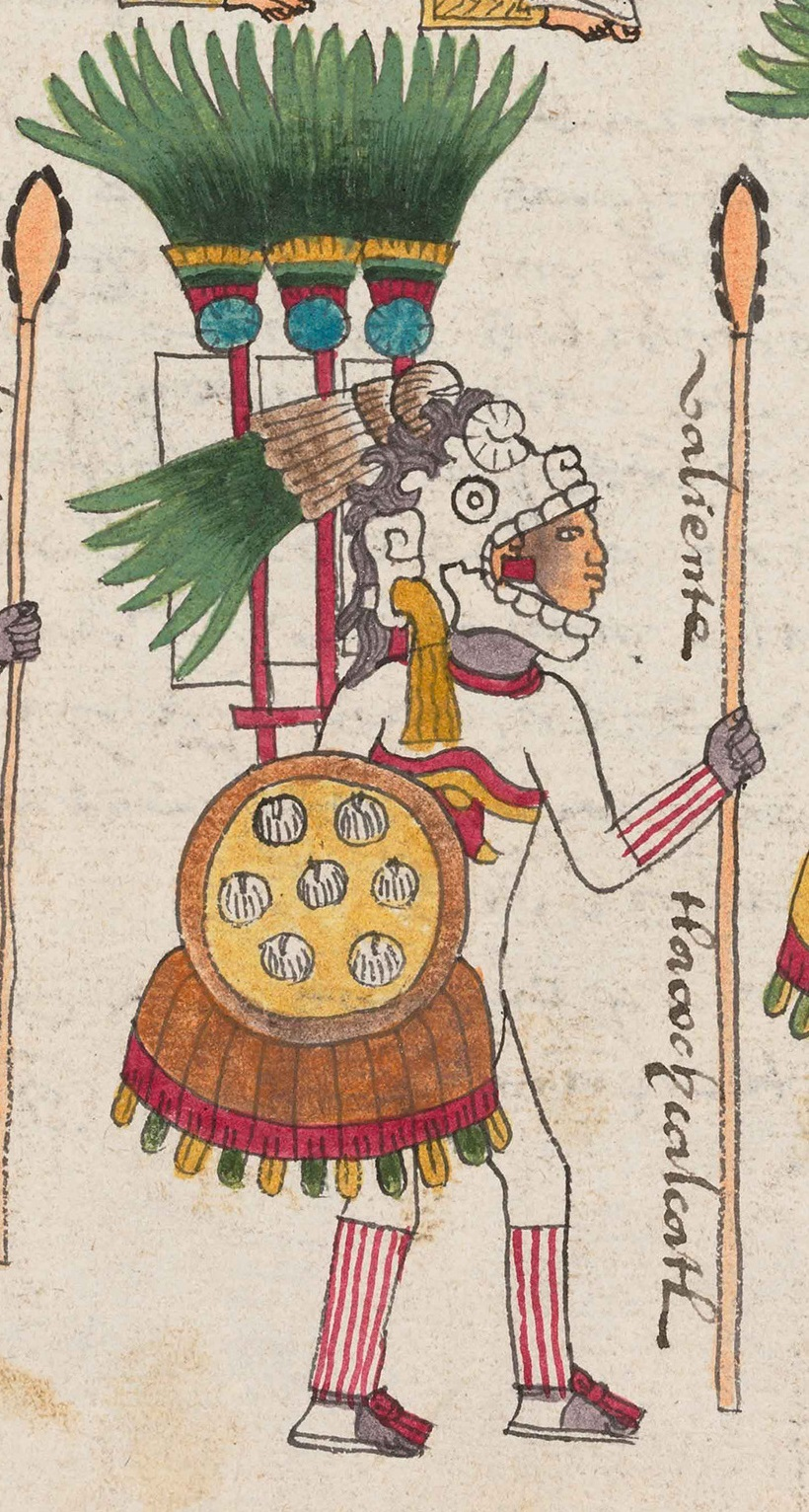
A tlacochcalcatl pictured in the Codex Mendoza. Mexico-Tenochtitlan kept the city-states under threat de facto just by military brute force.

The Aztec Empire was an example of an empire that ruled by indirect means. It was ethnically very diverse like most European empires but was more a system of tributes than a single unitary form of government unlike them. In the theoretical framework of imperial systems posited by American historian Alexander J. Motyl, the Aztec empire was an informal type of empire in that the Alliance did not claim supreme authority over its tributary provinces, but merely expected them to pay tributes. The empire was also territorially discontinuous, i.e. land did not connect all of its dominated territories. For example, the southern peripheral zones of Xoconochco were not in immediate contact with the central part of the empire. The hegemonic nature of the Aztec empire can be seen in the fact that generally local rulers were restored to their positions once they conquered their city-state, and the Aztecs did not interfere in local affairs as long as the tribute payments were made.

The form of government is often referred to as an empire, yet most areas within the empire were, in fact, organized as city-states (individually known as altepetl in Nahuatl, the language of the Aztecs). These were small polities ruled by a king or tlatoani (literally "speaker", plurally tlatoque) from an aristocratic dynasty. The Early Aztec period was a time of growth and competition among altepeme. After the Nahuas formed the empire in 1428 and the empire began its program of expansion through conquest, the altepetl remained the dominant form of organization at the local level. The efficient role of the altepetl as a regional political unit was largely responsible for the success of the empire's hegemonic form of control.

The term "Aztec Empire" is actually modern and not one used by the Aztecs themselves. The Aztec realm was at its core composed of three Nahuatl-speaking city-states in the densely populated Valley of Mexico. Asymmetries of power elevated one of those city states Tenochtitlan above the other two over time. The "Triple Alliance" came to establish hegemony over much of central Mesoamerica, including areas of great linguistic and cultural diversity. The Nahuas performed administration of the empire through largely traditional, indirect means. Something of a nascent bureaucracy, however, may have been beginning to form over time, insofar as the state organization became increasingly centralized.

=== Central administration ===
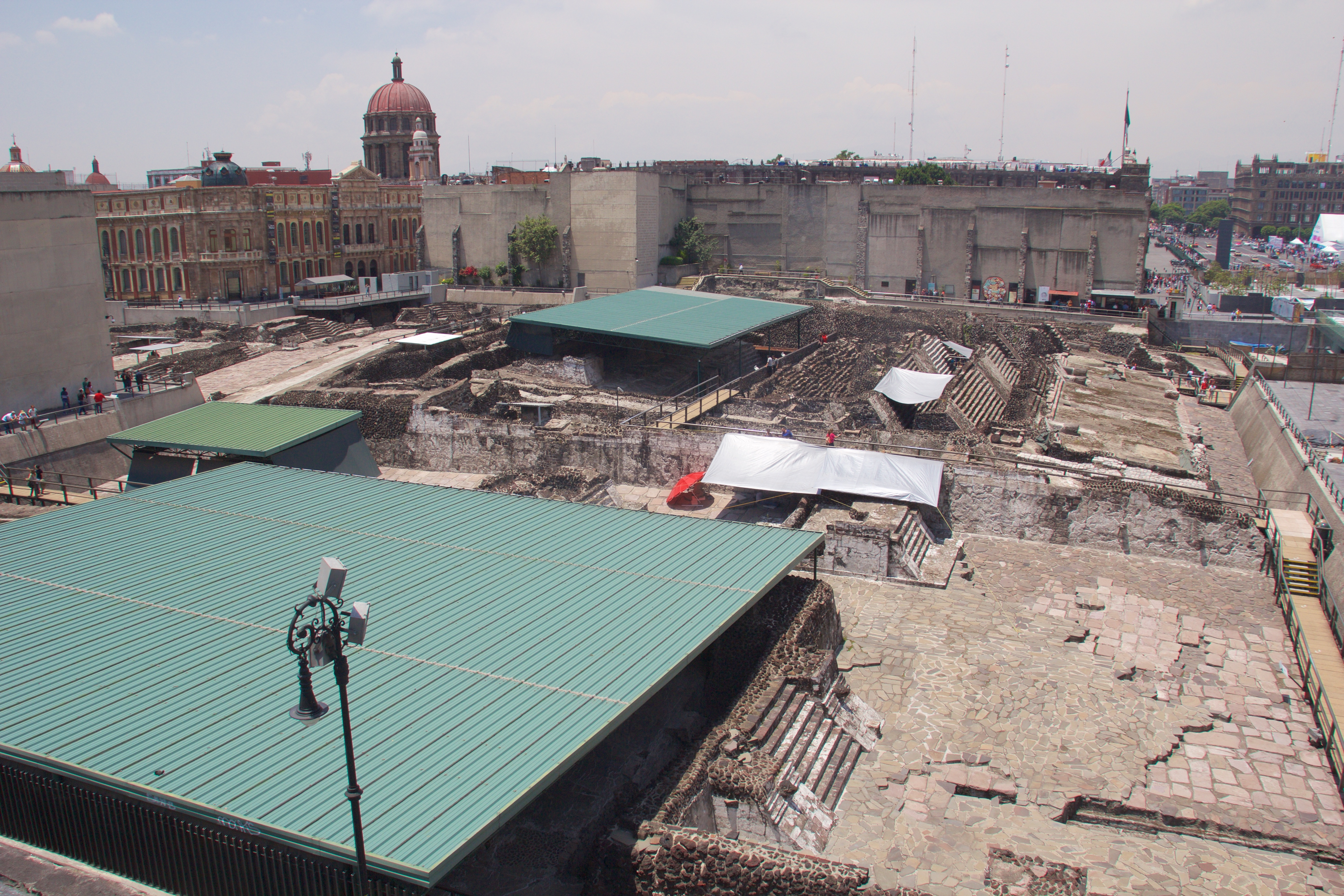
The Huēyi Teōcalli ruins in Mexico-Tenochtitlan remnants, present-day historic center of Mexico City

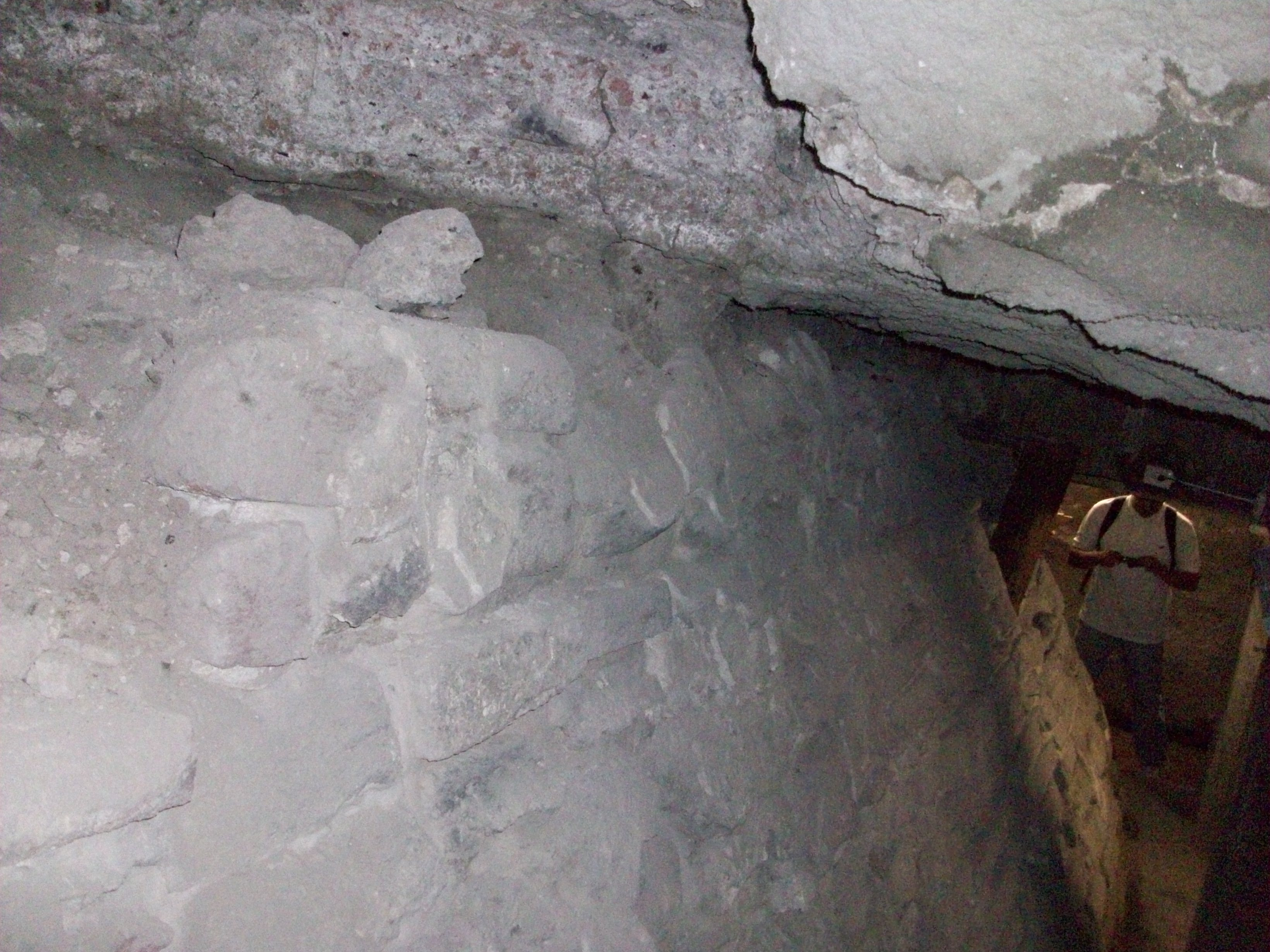
Ehecatl Temple in the foundations of the Mexico City Metropolitan Cathedral, historic center of Mexico City

Before the reign of Nezahualcoyotl (1429–1472), the Aztec empire operated as a confederation along traditional Mesoamerican lines. Independent altepetl were led by tlatoani (lit., "speakers"), who supervised village headmen, who in turn supervised groups of households. A typical Mesoamerican confederation placed a Huey Tlatoani (lit., "great speaker") at the head of several tlatoani. Following Nezahualcoyotl, the Aztec empire followed a somewhat divergent path, with some tlatoani of recently conquered or otherwise subordinated altepetl becoming replaced with calpixque stewards charged with collecting tribute on behalf of the Huetlatoani rather than simply replacing an old tlatoque with new ones from the same set of local nobility.

Yet the Huey tlatoani was not the sole executive. It was the responsibility of the Huey tlatoani to deal with the external issues of empire; the management of tribute, war, diplomacy, and expansion were all under the purview of the Huey tlatoani. It was the role of the Cihuacoatl to govern a given city itself. The Cihuacoatl was always a close relative of the Huey tlatoani; Tlacaelel, for example, was the brother of Moctezuma I. Both the title "Cihuacoatl", which means "female snake" (it is the name of a Nahua deity), and the role of the position, somewhat analogous to a European Viceroy or Prime Minister, reflect the dualistic nature of Nahua cosmology. Neither the position of Cihuacoatl nor the position of Huetlatoani were priestly, yet both did have important ritual tasks. Those of the former were associated with the "female" wet season, those of the latter with the "male" dry season. While the position of Cihuacoatl is best attested in Tenochtitlan, it is known that the position also existed the nearby altepetl of Azcapotzalco, Culhuacan, and Tenochtitlan's ally Texcoco. Despite the apparent lesser status of the position, a Cihuacoatl could prove both influential and powerful, as in the case of Tlacaelel.

Early in the history of the empire, Tenochtitlan developed a four-member military and advisory Council which assisted the Huey tlatoani in his decision-making: the tlacochcalcatl; the tlaccatecatl; the ezhuahuacatl; and the tlillancalqui. This design not only provided advice for the ruler, it also served to contain ambition on the part of the nobility, as henceforth Huey Tlatoani could only be selected from the council. Moreover, the actions of any one member of the council could easily be blocked by the other three, providing a simple system of checks on the ambition higher officials. These four Council members were also generals, members of various military societies. The ranks of the members were not equal, with the tlacochcalcatl and tlaccatecatl having a higher status than the others. These two Councillors were members of the two most prestigious military societies, the cuauhchique ("shorn ones") and the otontin ("Otomies"). The tetecuhtin, the relatives of the former Huey tlatoani, will choose the next Huey tlatoani from the four council members.

=== Provincial administration ===
Traditionally, provinces and altepetl were governed by hereditary tlatoani. As the empire grew, the system evolved further and some tlatoani were replaced by other officials. The other officials had similar authority to tlatoani. As has already been mentioned, directly appointed stewards (singular calpixqui, plural calpixque) were sometimes imposed on altepetl instead of the selection of provincial nobility to the same position of tlatoani. At the height of empire, the organization of the state into strategic tributary provinces saw an elaboration of this system. The 38 tributary provinces fell under the supervision of high stewards, or huecalpixque, whose authority extended over the lower-ranking calpixque. These calpixque and huecalpixque were essentially managers of the provincial tribute system which was overseen and coordinated in the paramount capital of Tenochtitlan not by the huetlatoani, but rather by a separate position altogether: the petlacalcatl. On the occasion that a recently conquered altepetl was seen as particularly restive, the Nahuas placed a military governor, or cuauhtlatoani, at the head of provincial supervision. During his reign, Moctezuma I elaborated the calpixque system, with two calpixque assigned per tributary province. The province itself stationed one, perhaps for supervising the collection of tribute, and the other in Tenochtitlan, perhaps for supervising storage of tribute. Commoners drew the tribute, the macehualtin, and distributed to the nobility, be they 'kings' (tlatoque), lesser rulers (teteuctin), or provincial nobility (pipiltin).

The Nahuas supervised the tribute collection by the above officials and relied upon the coercive power of the Aztec military, but also upon the cooperation of the pipiltin (the local nobility who were themselves exempt from and recipient to tribute) and the hereditary class of merchants known as pochteca. These pochteca had various gradations of ranks which granted them certain trading rights and so were not necessarily pipiltin themselves, yet they played an important role in both the growth and administration of the Aztec tributary system nonetheless. The pochteca strongly tied their power, political and economic, to the political and military power of the Aztec nobility and state. In addition to serving as diplomats (teucnenenque, or "travelers of the lord") and spies in the prelude to conquest, higher-ranking pochteca also served as judges in market plazas and were to certain degree autonomous corporate groups, having administrative duties within their own estate.

=== Ideology and state ===
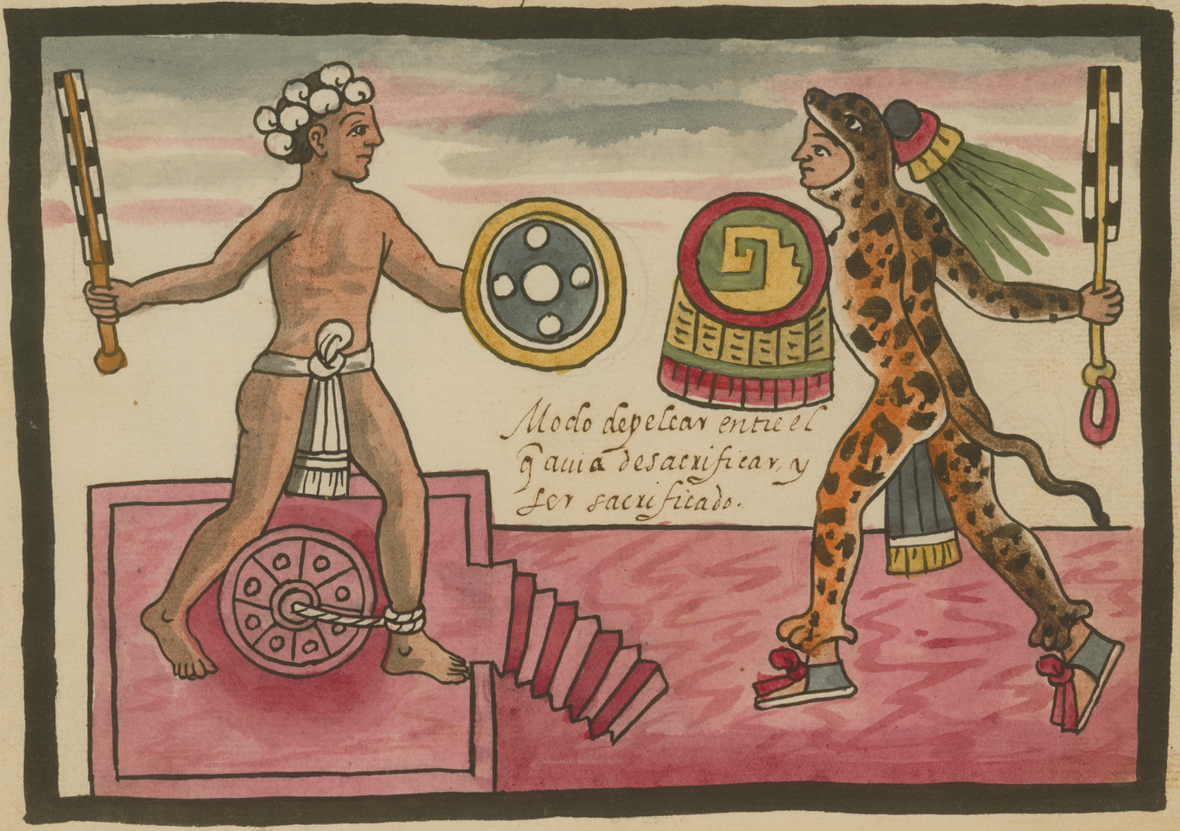
This page from the westernized Codex Tovar depicts a scene of gladiatorial sacrificial rite, celebrated on the festival of Tlacaxipehualiztli.

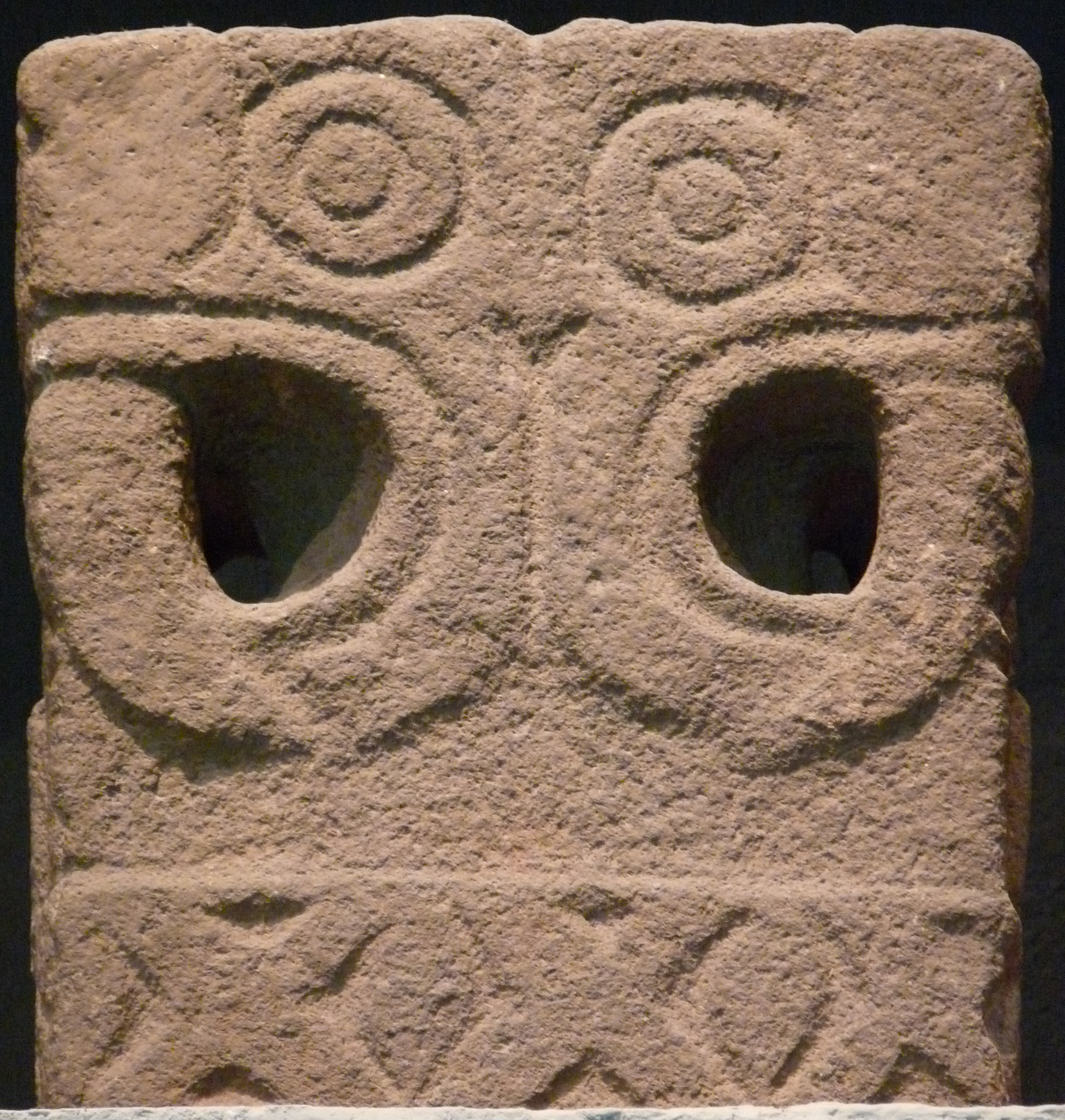
The Nahuas placed Techcatl, the Aztec sacrifice altar, in the sacrifice paving, and the courtyard on the south side of Huēyi Teōcalli. National Museum of Anthropology, Mexico City.

Nahua metaphysics centers around teotl, "a single, dynamic, vivifying, eternally self-generating and self-regenerating sacred power, energy or force." This is conceptualized in a kind of monistic pantheism as manifest in the supreme god Ometeotl, as well as a large pantheon of lesser gods and idealizations of natural phenomena such as stars and fire. Priests and educated upper classes held more monistic views, while the popular religion of the uneducated tended to embrace the polytheistic and mythological aspects.

The Aztec empire's state-sanctioned religion meanwhile had to fulfill the spiritual obligations of the upper classes while maintaining their control over the lower classes and conquered populations. This was executed in grand public religious ceremonies, sponsorship of the most popular cults, and a relative degree of religious freedom.

Rulers, if they are local teteuctin or tlatoani, or central Huetlatoani, were seen as representatives of the gods and therefore ruled by divine right. Tlatocayotl, or the principle of rulership, established that descent inherited this divine right. Political order was, therefore, also a cosmic order, and to kill a tlatoani was to transgress that order. For this reason, whenever the Nahuas killed or otherwise removed a tlatoani from their station, their stead typically placed a relative and member of the same bloodline. The establishment of the office of Huetlatoani understood through the creation of another level of rulership, hueitlatocayotl, standing in superior contrast to the lesser tlatocayotl principle.

A militaristic interpretation of Nahua religion, specifically a devout veneration of the sun god, Huitzilopochtli, guided expansion of the empire. Militaristic state rituals were performed throughout the year according to a ceremonial calendar of events, rites, and mock battles. The time period they lived in was understood as the Ollintonatiuh, or Sun of Movement, which was believed to have been the final age after which humanity would be destroyed. It was under Tlacaelel that Huitzilopochtli assumed his elevated role in the state pantheon and who argued that it was through blood sacrifice that the Sun would be maintained and thereby stave off the end of the world. It was under this new, militaristic interpretation of Huitzilopochtli that Aztec soldiers were encouraged to fight wars and capture enemy soldiers for sacrifice. Though blood sacrifice was common in Mesoamerica, the scale of human sacrifice under the Aztecs was likely unprecedented in the region.

=== Schematic of hierarchy ===
Executive & Military	Tribute System	Judicial System	Provincial System
Huetlatoani, the paramount or external ruler; Cihuacoatl, the lesser or internal ruler; Council of Four, an advisory body of generals and source of future Huetlatoani; Tlacochcalcatl; Tlacateccatl; Ezhuahuacatl; Tlillancalqui; Military societies; Cuachicqueh, or Shorn Ones; Cuāuhtli, or Eagle Knights; Ocēlōmeh, or Jaguar Warriors; Otōntin, or Otomies	Petlacalcatl, central head of tribute; Huecalpixque, provincial overseers of tribute; Calpixque, pairs of tribute administrators	Supreme Court; Special Courts; Appellate Courts; Pochteca Courts; Pochteca agents	Tlatoani, a subordinate ruler of a province, otherwise ruled by a: Cuauhtlatoani, a military governor; Heads of Calpōlli wards; Heads of households within calpōlli wards who served as corvée labor

=== Provincial structure ===
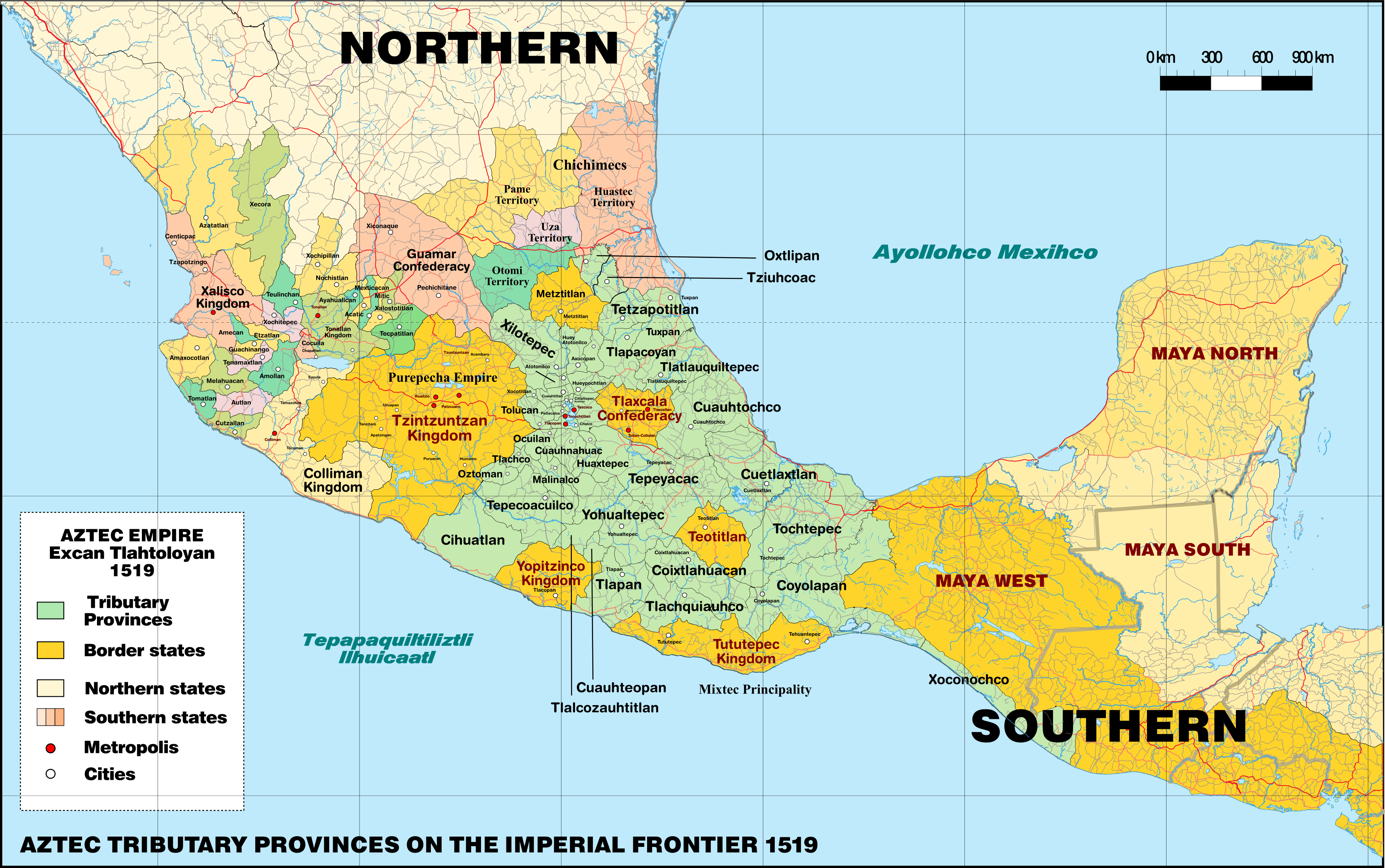
The Aztec Empire's territorial organization in 1519

Originally, the Aztec Empire was a loose alliance between three cities: Tenochtitlan, Texcoco, and the most junior partner, Tlacopan. As such, they were known as the 'Triple Alliance.' This political form was very common in Mesoamerica, where alliances of city-states were ever fluctuating. However, over time, Tenochtitlan assumed paramount authority in the alliance, and although each partner city shared spoils of war and rights to regular tribute from the provinces and were governed by their own Huetlatoani, Tenochtitlan became the largest, most powerful, and most influential of the three cities. It was the de facto and acknowledged center of empire.

Though the Aztecs did not describe them this way, there were essentially two types of provinces: Tributary and Strategic. Strategic provinces were essentially subordinate client states which provided tribute or aid to the Aztec state under "mutual consent." Tributary provinces, on the other hand, provided regular tribute to the empire; obligations on the part of Tributary provinces were mandatory rather than consensual.

Organization of the Aztec Empire
The Triple Alliance	Provinces	
Tenōchtitlān, modern Mexico City; Texcoco, modern Texcoco municipality; Tlacopan, also modern Mexico City; Nahuatl glyphic for Texcoco, Tenochtitlan, and Tlacopan.	Tributary Provinces	Strategic Provinces
Tenōchtitlān, modern Mexico City; Texcoco, modern Texcoco municipality; Tlacopan, also modern Mexico City; Nahuatl glyphic for Texcoco, Tenochtitlan, and Tlacopan.	Atotonilco de Pedraza; Atotonilco el Grande; Axocopan; Cihuatlan (to the west of modern San Luis de la Loma); Coixtlahuaca; Coyolapan; Cuetlaxtlan; Cuahuacan, modern Santa María Magdalena Cahuacán in Mexico state; Cuauhnāhuac, modern Cuernavaca; Cuauhtochco, now the archaeological site of Huatusco; Huaxtepec, or Oaxtepec; Malinalco; Mictlān; Ocuilan; Oxitipan, possibly near Aquismón or south of Ciudad Valles; Quiauhteopan, southwest of Olinalá; Tepeyacac; Tepecoacuilco; Tlachco, or Taxco; Tlalcozauhtitlan, very close to Teopantecuanitlan; Tlapacoyan; Tlapan; Tlatlauhquitepec; Tlachquiauhco; Tochpan, or Tuxpan; Tōchtepēc, or Tuxtepec; Tollocan, modern Toluca; Tzicoac, possibly west of Tuxpan; Xilotepec; Xoconochco; Xocotitlan; Yoaltepec, or San Juan Ihualtepec	Acatlan; Ahuatlán; Ayotlan; Cempoala; Chiapan; Chiauhtlan; Cuauhchinanco; Huexotla; Ixtepexi; Ixtlahuaca; Miahuatlan; Misantla; Ocuituco; Tecomaixtlahuacan; Tecpantepec; Temazcaltepec; Teozacoalco; Teozapotlán; Tetellan, modern Tetela del Río in Guerrero state; Tetela; Xalapa; Zompanco

=== List of rulers ===
Tenochtitlan		Texcoco	Tlacopan
Huetlatoani: Ācamāpichtli, r. 1367–1387; Huitzilihuitl, r. 1391–1415; Chīmalpopōca, r. 1415–1426; Itzcōhuātl, r. 1427–1440; Motēuczōma Ilhuicamīna, r. 1440–1468; Axayacatl, r. 1469–1481; Tizocic, r. 1481–1486; Āhuizotl, r. 1486–1502; Motēuczōma Xocoyotzin, r. 1502–1520; Cuitlāhuac, r. 1520; Cuāuhtemōc, r. 1521–1524	Cihuacoatl: Tlacaelel, r. c. 1426–1487; Tlilpotonqui, r. 1487–1503; Tlacaeleltzin Xocoyotl, r. 1503–1520; Matlatzincatzin, r. 1520; Tlacontzin, r. 1521–1524; Tlacontzin was baptised don Juan Velásquez and made ruler under Cortés, r. 1524–1526	Huetlatoani: Quinatzin Tlaltecatzin, r. 1298–1357; Techotlalatzin, r. 1357 or 1377–1409; Ixtlilxochitl Ome Tochtli, r. 1409–1418; Nezahualcoyōtl, r. 1431–1472; Nezahualpilli, r. 1473–1515; Cacamatzin, r. 1516–1520; Coanacoch, r. 1521–1524; Tecocoltzin, r. 1524–1525	Huetlatoani: Aculnahuacatl Tzaqualcatl, r. c. 1400–1430; Totoquihuaztli I, r. c. 1430–1469; Chimalopopoca, r. 1469–1489; Totoquihuaztli II, r. 1489–1519; Tetlepanquetzaltzin, r. 1519–1524

=== Mythological nature rulers ===
These are Aztec gods and goddesses, who were also part of the Thirteen Heavens, as well as the Aztec Empire.

==== Gods ====
Quetzalcoatl glyph from Codex Borgia

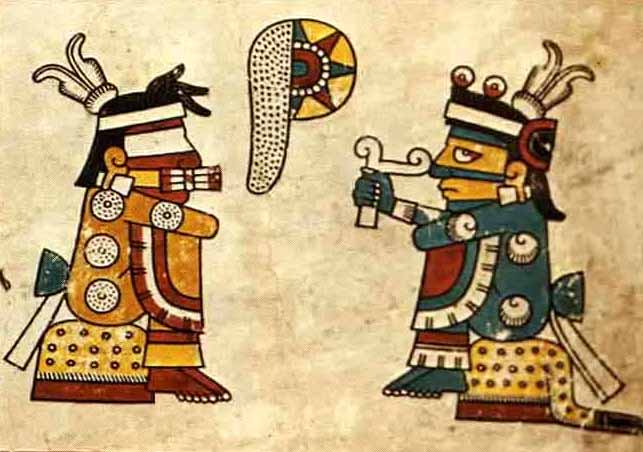
Blue and Red Tezcatlipocas in the Codex Fejérváry-Mayer

- Centeotl, god of maize associated with the Tianquiztli (goddesses of the Pleiades). Centeotl's name is also spelt as Cinteotl and was goddess-like.
- Chalchiuhtotolin, the god of cleansing and contamination, absolver of human guilt, and god of fate.
- Xochipilli, god of flowers, pleasure, feasting, frivolity and artistic creativity.
- Huehuecoyotl, god of old-age, origin, and deception. He is also the patron of wisdom, and is known for playing tricks. His name is similar to the god of happiness, Ueuecoyotl.
- Huitzilopochtli, god of will and war, patron god of force, ruler of the South.
- Itztlacoliuhqui-Ixquimilli, god of frost, ice, cold, winter, sin, punishment and human misery. He is also the god of blindfolded justice.
- Ometecuhtli, god of duality and substance.
- Itztli, god of stone who is a variant of Tezcatlipoca.
- Mictlantecuhtli, god of the Underworld (Mictlan). He is depicted as a skeleton with various gory features, such as his exposed liver which dangles from his chest cavity.
- Patecatl, god of healing and patron god of doctors and peyote. He is the father of the Centzontotochtin.
- Piltzintecuhtli, god of visions and the sun. In Aztec mythology Piltzintecuhtli is associated with Mercury and healing.
- Quetzalcoatl, god of life, the light and wisdom, lord of the winds and the day, ruler of the West.
- Tecciztecatl, god of the moon. Tecciztecatl is Tlaloc and Chalchiuhtlicue's son.
- Tepeyollotl, god of animals, darkened caves, echoes and earthquakes. Tepeyollotl is a variant of Tezcatlipoca and is associated with mountains.
- Tezcatlipoca, god of providence, darkness and the invisible, lord of the night, ruler of the North. Tezcatlipoca had overthrown Quetzalcoatl, who overthrew him in return.
- Tlahuizcalpantecuhtli, god of dawn (Venus) and aspect of Quetzalcoatl.
- Tlaloc, god of rain, lightning and thunder. He is associated with fertility and agriculture.
- Tonacatecuhtli, god of sustenance associated with Ometecuhtli.
- Tonatiuh, god of the sun.
- Xipe Totec, god of rejuvenation, vegetation and spring, lord of the seasons, ruler of the East.
- Xiuhtecuhtli, god of fire and time.
- Ehecatl, god of wind.
- Tzontemoc, god who resided in one of the nine layers of the Underworld.
- Xolotl, god of death, associated with Venus as the Evening Star. He is the twin god, and a double of Quetzalcoatl.
- Mixcoatl, Aztec god of fishing and hunting and old god of hurricanes and storms who was associated with the Milky Way.
- Nanahuatzin, Sun god. Nanahuatzin sacrificed himself in a burning fire so that the sun would continue to shine all over the world, so the god Tonatiuh took his place.
- Atlahua, god of water and protector of archers and fishermen. The Aztecs prayed to him when there were deaths in water.
- Opochtli, god of fishing and birdcatchers. According to legend he is the inventor of the harpoon and net.
- Painal, Huitzilopochtli's messenger.
- Techlotl, god who resided in one of the nine layers of the Underworld. This deity was associated with owls.
- Ometochtli, god of pulque and leader of the Centzontotochtin.

==== Goddesses ====
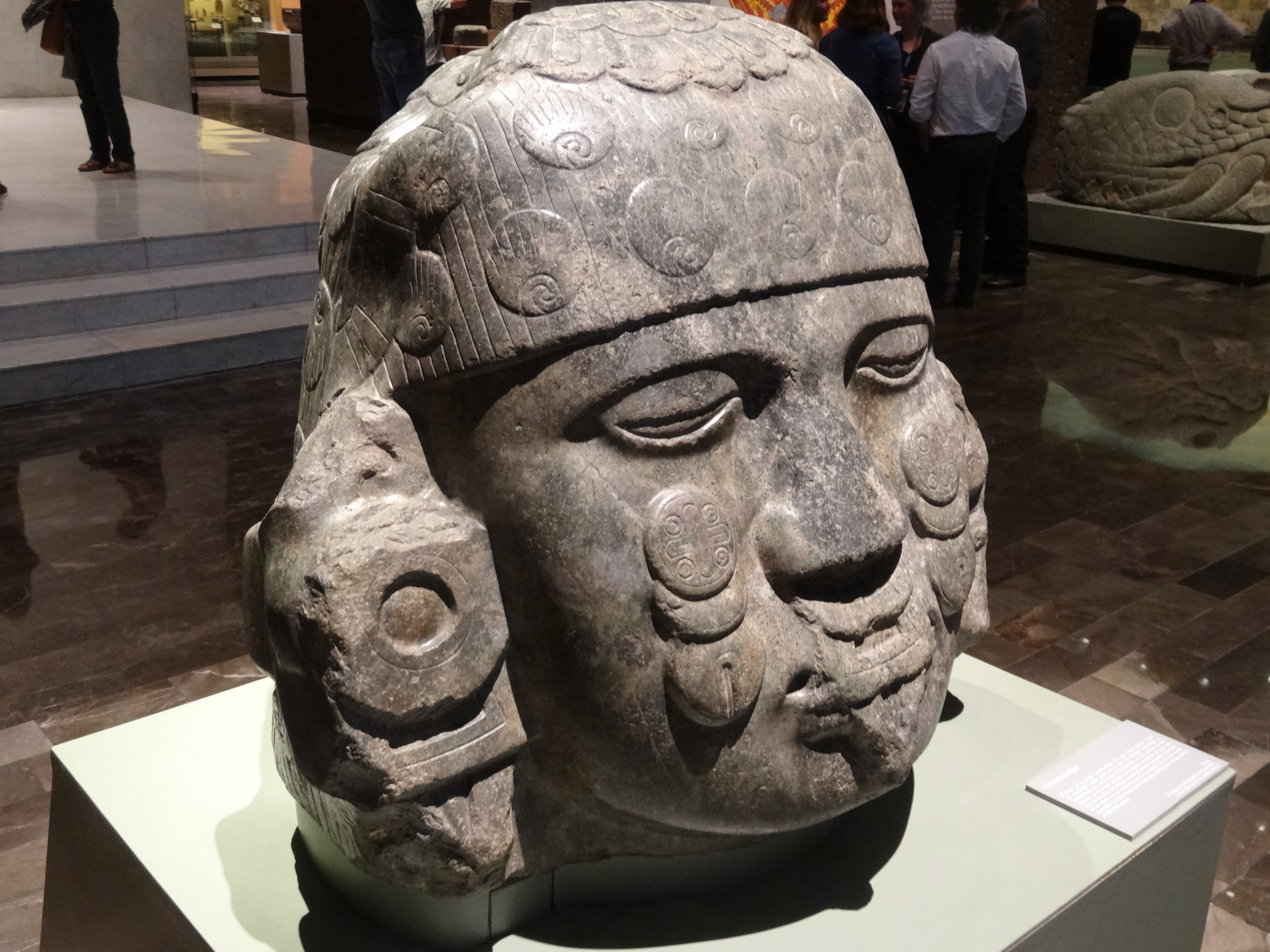
Moon goddess Coyolxauhqui sculpture

- Chalchiuhtlicue, goddess of running water, lakes, rivers, oceans, streams, horizontal waters, storms and baptism.
- Chantico, goddess of fire, homes and volcanoes.
- Cihuacoatl, goddess of childbirth and picker of souls.
- Citlalicue, goddess of female stars in the Milky Way.
- Itzpapalotl, goddess of death. She was the leader of the Tzitzimitl. Stone knives pop out from her eyes.
- Mayahuel, goddess of agave and maguey. She was the Centzontotochtin's mother.
- Mictecacihuatl, goddess of the Underworld (Mictlan).
- Tlaltecuhtli, old goddess of earth (changed in the Earth's landscape and atmosphere).
- Tlazolteotl, goddess of lust, passions, carnality, and sexual misdeeds.
- Xochiquetzal, goddess of flowers, love, pleasure and beauty. She protects young mothers, and is forever youthful and beautiful.
- Atlatoman, patron goddess of those who are born with physical deformities or Mexica who suffer from open sores. Some codexes also mark this deity as the cause of these ailments.
- Huixtocihuatl, goddess of salt and patron of cultivated foods (including people in the salt trade).
- Chalmecacihuatl, goddess who resided in one of the nine layers of the Underworld. She was Tzontemoc's wife.
- Chicomecoatl, goddess of agriculture.
- Coyolxauhqui, goddess or leader of the Centzonhuitznahua, associated with the moon.

=== Mythological nature groups of rulers ===
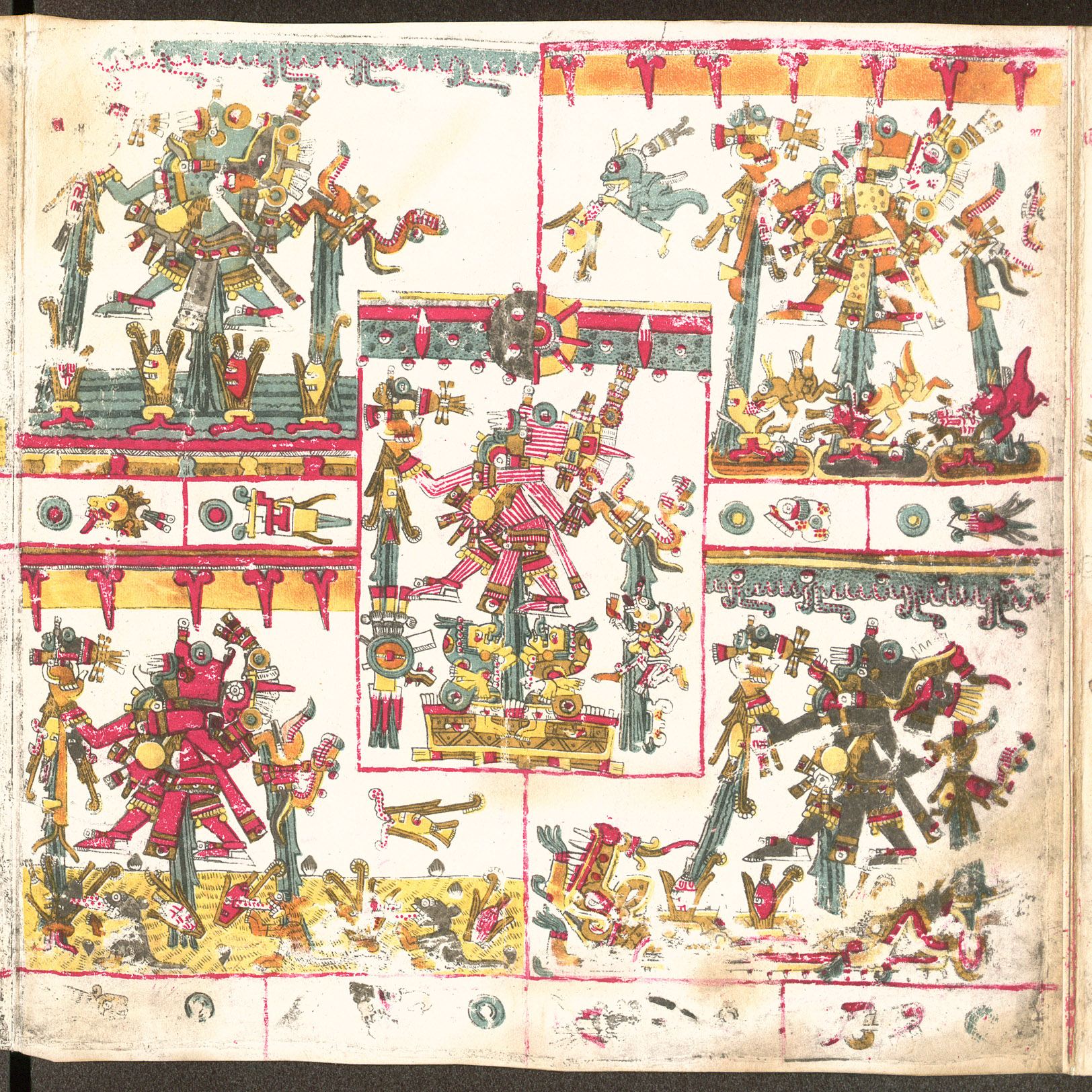
The five Tlaloquê as depicted in the Codex Borgia

- Cihuateteo, (Cihuacoatl) the malevolent spirits of women who died in childbirth. Their name comes from the goddess Cihuacoatl. Their name is also spelt as "Ciuateteo". (Goddesses)
- Ahuiateteo, gods of excess and pleasure, the gods who are known as Macuilcozcacuauhtli, Macuilcuetzpalin, Macuilmalinalli, Macuiltochtli, and Macuilxochitl. (Gods)
- Ixcuiname, goddesses of carnality. (Goddesses)
- Cinteteo, gods of the maizes. (Gods)
- Centzontotochtin, (Ometochtli) gods of pulque. (Gods)
- Xiuhtotontli, the gods of fire (alternative manifestations or states of Xiuhtecuhtli). (Gods)
- Ehecatotontli, (Ehecatl) breath-holding gods of the breezes – who are just like Ehecatl. (Gods)
- Civateteo, (Cihuacoatl) goddesses who are vampires. Civateteo are similar to Cihuateteo, who are not as bad as Civateteo are. Civateteo mostly live in regular Mexico, and Civateteo come from somewhere vampire-esque. (Goddesses)
- Tzitzimitl, (Itzpapalotl) goddesses of the stars. Tzitzimitl mostly live in regular Mexico, and Tzitzimitl come from Tamoanchan. (Goddesses)
- Centzonmimixcoa, (Cuahuitlicac) 400 gods of the northern stars and "The 400 Northerners." (gods)
- Centzonhuitznahua, (Coyolxauhqui) 400 gods of the southern stars. (Gods)
- Tlaloque, gods of rain, weather and mountains. Tlaloc had also been considered the ruler of this group. (Gods)
- Tianquizli, (Citlalicue) these are goddesses of the Pleiades. (Goddesses)
- Ometeotl, gods of the duality. (Gods)
- Tezcatlipocas, creator god's. (Gods)
- Tonalleque, embodied spirits who died during the Battle (Gods)

=== Mythological sacred places ===
- Tamoanchan, a place where Itzpapalotl usually rules over. The gods created the first of the present human race out of sacrificed blood and ground human bones. Tamoanchan may mean "We go down to our home."
- Mictlan, the place where Mictlantecuhtli and Mictecacihuatl rule in Aztec mythology. This is literally the underworld.
- Tlalocan, the place where Tlaloc and Chalchiuhtlicue rule in Aztec mythology. One of several locations humans may go in the afterlife.

== Law ==
Ruler Nezahualcoyotl developed the most developed code of law in the city-state of Texcoco under him. It was a formal written code, not merely a collection of customary practices. The sources for knowing about the legal code are colonial-era writings by Franciscan Toribio de Benavente Motolinia, Franciscan Fray Juan de Torquemada, and Texcocan historians Juan Bautista Pomar, and Fernando de Alva Cortés Ixtlilxochitl. The law code in Texcoco under Nezahualcoyotl was legalistic, as many tried cases by particular types of evidence and many disregarded the social status of the litigants, and consisted of 80 written laws. These laws called for severe, publicly administered punishments, creating a legal framework of social control.

Much less is known about the legal system in Tenochtitlan, which might be less legalistic or sophisticated as those of Texcoco for this period. Those under the reign of Moctezuma I established it. These laws served to establish and govern relations between the state, classes, and individuals. State authorities meted out punishments solely. The Nahuas enshrined Nahua mores in these laws, criminalizing public acts of homosexuality, drunkenness, and nudity, not to mention more universal proscriptions against theft, murder, and property damage. As stated before, pochteca could serve as judges, often exercising judicial oversight of their own members. Likewise, military courts dealt with both cases within the military and without during wartime. There was an appeal process, with appellate courts standing between local, typically market-place courts, on the provincial level and a supreme court and two special higher appellate courts at Tenochtitlan. One of those two special courts dealt with cases arising within Tenochtitlan, the other with cases originating from outside the capital. The ultimate judicial authority laid in hands of the Huey tlatoani, who had the right to appoint lesser judges.

== See also ==
- Aztec
- Aztec mythology
- Aztec philosophy
- Aztec religion
- Aztec society
- Crónica Mexicayotl
- Flower war
- List of Aztec gods and supernatural beings
- List of tlatoque of Tenochtitlan
- List of tlatoque of Tetzcoco
- Tlacopan#Rulers of Tlacopan
- List of rulers of Tlatelolco
- Mesoamerica
- Nahuas
- Aztec codices

== Bibliography ==
=== Primary sources ===
- Berdan, Frances F.; Anawalt, Patricia Rieff (1997) [c. 1541]. The Essential Codex Mendoza. University of California Press. ISBN 978-0-520-20454-6.
- Diaz del Castillo, Bernal (2003) [1576]. The Discovery and Conquest of Mexico. Cambridge, MA: Da Capo Press. ISBN 0-306-81319-X.
- Durán, Diego (1994) [c. 1581]. History of the Indies of New Spain. University of Oklahoma Press.
- Alvarado Tezozomoc, Hernando (1975) [c. 1598]. Crónica Mexicana. Mexico City: Universidad Nacional Autónoma de Mexico.

=== Secondary sources ===
- Barnett, Ronald A. (2007-11-01). "Mesoamerican religious concepts: Part two". MexConnect.
- Calnek, Edward (1978). "Urbanization of the Americas from its Beginnings to the Present". In Schaedel, R. P.; Hardoy, J. E.; Kinzer, N. S. (eds.). The City-State in the Basin of Mexico: The Late Prehispanic Period. pp. 463–470.
- Davies, Nigel (1973). The Aztecs: A History. University of Oklahoma Press.
- Evans, Susan T. (2008). Ancient Mexico and Central America: Archaeology and Culture History, 2nd edition. Thames & Hudson, New York. ISBN 978-0-500-28714-9.
- Hassig, Ross (1988). Aztec Warfare: Imperial Expansion and Political Control. University of Oklahoma Press. ISBN 0-8061-2121-1.
- Maffie, James (n.d.). "Aztec Philosophy". The Internet Encyclopedia of Philosophy. ISSN 2161-0002.
- Leon-Portilla, Miguel (1963). Aztec Thought and Culture: A Study of the Ancient Náhuatl Mind. Translated by Davis, Jack E. University of Oklahoma Press.
- Pollard, H. P. (1993). Tariacuri's Legacy. University of Oklahoma Press.
- Smith, Michael (1984). "The Aztec Migrations of Nahuatl Chronicles: Myth or History?". Ethnohistory. 31 (3): 153–168. doi:10.2307/482619. JSTOR 482619.
- Smith, Michael (2009). The Aztecs, 2nd Edition. Malden, MA: Blackwell Publishing. ISBN 978-0-631-23015-1.
- Smith, M. E. (2001). "The Archaeological Study of Empires and Imperialism in Pre-Hispanic Central Mexico". Journal of Anthropological Archaeology. 20 (3): 245–284. doi:10.1006/jaar.2000.0372.
- Soustelle, Jacques (1964) [1955]. The Daily Life of the Aztecs (English ed.). London: Penguin. ISBN 978-0-486-42485-9.
