= Juan de Santo Domingo de Mendoza Tlacaeleltzin =

Mexican politician

Don Juan de Santo Domingo de Mendoza Tlacaeleltzin

Tlatoani of Itztlacozauhcan
- In office 1548–1563
- Preceded by: Don Tomás de San Martín Quetzalmazatzin
- Succeeded by: Don Gregorio de los Angeles Tepoztlixayacatzin

Personal details
- Died: 1563
- Children: Don Diego; Don Pedro
- Parents: Don Tomás de San Martín Quetzalmazatzin (father); Quetzalpetlatzin (mother)

Don Juan de Santo Domingo de Mendoza Tlacaeleltzin Chichimeca teuctli (died 1563) was the tlatoani (ruler) of Itztlacozauhcan in Amaquemecan, Chalco from 1548 to 1563.

Don Juan's father, don Tomás de San Martín Quetzalmazatzin, had been the previous tlatoani of Itztlacozauhcan, having been installed there by Hernán Cortés. His mother was Quetzalpetlatzin, don Tomás's first wife, who (according to Chimalpahin) was a Mexica noblewoman, the daughter of Tlilpotoncatzin, cihuacoatl of Tenochtitlan, thus making don Juan the great grandson of the cihuacoatl Tlacaelel, his namesake. He had two sons, don Diego and don Pedro.

Don Juan died in 1563. In 1564 his half-brother don Gregorio de los Angeles Tepoztlixayacatzin succeeded him as tlatoani.

Preceded by don Tomás de San Martín; Quetzalmazatzin	Tlatoani of Itztlacozauhcan; 1548–1563	Succeeded by don Gregorio de los Angeles; Tepoztlixayacatzin
