= Tlilpotoncatzin =

Tlilpotonqui

2nd Cihuacoatl of Mexico-Tenochtitlan
- In office 8 Reed (1487) – 11 Reed (1503)
- Preceded by: Tlacaelel I
- Succeeded by: Tlacaelel II

Personal details
- Died: 11 Reed (1503)
- Spouse(s): Xiuhtoztzin; Quauhtlamiyahualtzin
- Children: 14 children
- Parents: Tlacaelel (father); Maquiztzin (mother)

Tlilpotonqui or Tlilpotoncatzin (died in the year 11 Reed/1503) was the second cihuacoatl ('president') of Mexico-Tenochtitlan.

Tlilpotoncatzin was the second son of Tlacaelel and Maquiztzin. His father was a son of the second tlatoani ('ruler' or 'king') of Tenochtitlan, Huitzilihuitl. While Tlacaelel never became tlatoani himself, as cihuacoatl he played a significant role in the creation of the Aztec Empire. His mother was the daughter of Huehue Quetzalmacatzin, king of Itztlacozauhcan in Amaquemecan Chalco. Tlilpotoncatzin succeeded his father as cihuacoatl upon his death in the year 8 Reed (1487).

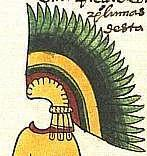
A quetzalpatzactli, from the Codex Mendoza.

According to the Crónica mexicayotl of Fernando Alvarado Tezozomoc, composed around 1598, Tlilpotoncatzin was a great, brave warrior. In battle he wore the quetzalpatzactli, a crest of quetzal feathers.

Tlilpotoncatzin took at least two wives, both from Amaquemecan: Xiuhtoztzin, the daughter of Yaopaintzin, quauhtlatoani of Tequanipan Huixtoco; and Quauhtlamiyahualtzin, a noblewoman from Acxotlan Cihuateopan. He fathered fourteen children, eleven males and three females. A son by Xiuhtoztzin, Miccacalcatl Tlatletecuintzin, was installed as the ruler of Tequanipan; and one of his daughters, Tzihuacxochitzin II, married Moctezuma II, and gave birth to Leonor Moctezuma and María Moctezuma.

Tlilpotoncatzin died in the year 11 Reed (1503). He was succeeded by his nephew Tlacaelel II, the son of his elder brother Cacamatzin.

== Notes ==
Preceded by Tlacaelel I	Cihuacoatl of Mexico-Tenochtitlan; 1487–1503	Succeeded by Tlacaelel II
