= Huehue Quetzalmacatzin =

Tlatoani (ruler) of Amaquemecan

Huehueh Quetzalmazatzin

Tlatoani of Amaquemecan
- Spouse: Tlacocihuatzin Ilama
- Issue: Maquiztzin
- Father: Ipantlaqualloctzin

Huehueh Quetzalmazatzin was a tlatoani (ruler) of Amaquemecan in 15th-century Mesoamerica.

== Family ==
He was the son of Ipantlaqualloctzin.

His wife was Tlacocihuatzin Ilama. Their daughter was Maquiztzin, wife of Tlacaelel and mother of Cacamatzin.

His family is mentioned by annalist Chimalpahin.
