= Chimalpopoca (disambiguation) =

Chimalpopoca may refer to:

- Chimalpopoca, Aztec emperor
- Chimalpopoca (Moctezuma), son of Moctezuma Xocoyotzin
- Chimalpopoca (Tlacopan), ruler of Tlacopan
- Faustino Galicia, scholar of Nahuatl
- The Codex Chimalpopoca
