= Macuilxochitzin =

Female Aztec Poet

Macuilxochitzin (born c. 1435), also referred to in some texts as Macuilxochitl, was a poet (cuicanitl) during the peak years of the Aztec civilization. She was the daughter of Tlacaélael, a counselor to the Aztec kings and the niece of the Tlatoani warrior Axayacatl. She lived through the height of the Aztec civilization's expansion. Her life and works are an example of gender parallelism in pre-Hispanic Mexico, where women were given the same opportunities enjoyed by men.

== Life ==
There is little information about the life of Macuilxochitzin. The poet was born about 1435 to a prominent family of Aztec nobility through her father Tlacaélael, who was a famous politician and served as adviser to the Tlatoanis. She was also the daughter (or the second in command) to the powerful female figure called Cihuacoatl (Woman Snake). She had twelve siblings, each born to a different mother.

Tlacaélael may also have adopted her from a tribe called Chichimeca after it was destroyed by nomadic incursions, and then given her the name "Macuilxochitzin." Her name probably means "Madam Five Flower," based on the Aztec, having been born on a 5 Flower day on the Aztec calendar. However, other scholars argue that her name could be derived from the name of a goddess of the arts, songs and dance, once she was already a recognized poet. In addition to poetry, Macuilxochitzin was skilled in embroidery and loom weaving.

== Works ==
According to Miguel León Portilla in his book Fifteen Poets of the Aztec World, Macuilxochitzin lived in Mexico-Tenochtitlan during the pinnacle of the Aztec civilization. Portilla states that she lived her life at court and was "as wise and as competent as the king." Her poetry was also described as reflective of her insider knowledge of the king and Aztec politics. The majority of her poetic work focused on the battles and confrontations that her father waged during the expansion of the Aztec empire across Mesoamerica. Only one poem that survives from that legacy can be attributed to her authorship and pertains to the decisive actions of a group of Otomi women who, through their prayers, saved the life of Tílatl, the Otomi captain who had been injured by a Mexica sovereign. This campaign, which was planned by her father, happened during the conquest of Axayácatl where the indigenous groups, the Matlatzincas and Otomies, had settled in the Toluca Valley in 1476. Most of the poetry, however, extolled the Aztec forces and the leadership of their sovereign.
