= Simon Levack =

British author (born 1965)

Simon Levack (born 1965) is a British author of historical mystery novels.

== Career ==
To date he has published four books: Demon of the Air, Shadow of the Lords, City of Spies and Tribute of Death.

All are set in Precolumbian Mexico on the eve of the Spanish colonization of the Americas and feature as the protagonist Yaotl, a fictitious slave to Tlilpotonqui, the Cihuacóatl or chief minister in the Aztec state of Tenochtitlan under Hueyi Tlatoani, or Emperor, Moctezuma II. Demon of the Air won the Debut Dagger Award, given by the UK Crime Writers' Association, in 2000.

He has also published short stories in Ellery Queen's Mystery Magazine featuring the same character and setting.

His work has been noted for its historical detail, complex plotting, humour and often graphic violence.

He has acknowledged Australian historian and anthropologist Inga Clendinnen and the work of Bernardino de Sahagún, compiler of the Florentine Codex, as influences; he has also (in an interview with the Criminal History ezine) indicated that science fiction has been an influence on his work.

== Bibliography ==
=== Aztec ===
1. Demon of the Air (2004)
2. Shadow of the Lords (2005)
3. City of Spies (2006)
4. Tribute of Death (2007)

=== Short fiction ===
- "The Coming of the Gods" (2006)
- "Jade Skirt" (2006)
