= Cacamatzin (tlacochcalcatl) =

15th-century Aztec noble

- Born: Mexico Tenochtitlan
- Died: Michoacán
- Relatives: Son of Tlacaelel and Maquiztzin
- Military career
- Allegiance: Mexico Tenochtitlan
- Rank: Tlacochcalcatl

Cacamatzin was a 15th-century Aztec noble — the eldest son of the cihuacoatl, Tlacaelel — and warrior who held the title of Tlacochcalcatl. His mother was princess Maquiztzin.

He had twelve children, only three of whom are known:

- A female (name unknown), who married Nezahualpilli, the tlatoani of Texcoco. The pair had a son, named Cacamatzin after his grandfather, who succeeded his father as ruler of Texcoco.
- Tlacaelel II, named after his grandfather, who also became cihuacoatl.
- Chicuey or Chicome Axochitzin, a warrior whose daughter became the mistress of Juan Rodríguez de Villafuerte, a Spanish conquistador.

Cacamatzin was killed by the Purépecha after being captured in battle.
