= Maquiztzin =

15th-century Aztec noble

- Spouse: Tlacaelel
- Issue: Cacamatzin; Tlilpotoncatzin; Xiuhpopocatzin
- Father: Huehue Quetzalmacatzin
- Mother: Tlacocihuatzin Ilama

Maquiztzin was the daughter of the Chalca ruler Huehue Quetzalmacatzin and his wife, Tlacocihuatzin Ilama, in 15th-century Mesoamerica.

She married Tenochcan Tlacaelel and moved to Tenochtitlan with him. She had five children. Her eldest son was Cacamatzin. One of other children was the great warrior Tlilpotoncatzin. The last child was Princess Xiuhpopocatzin. It is unknown where she went.

She was a grandmother of Tlacaelel II, and an ancestor of Leonor Moctezuma and María Moctezuma.

== Notes ==
- Chimalpahin Cuauhtlehuanitzin, Domingo Francisco de San Antón Muñón (1997). "Mexican History or Chronicle". Codex Chimalpahin: society and politics in Mexico Tenochtitlan, Tlatelolco, Texcoco, Culhuacan, and other Nahua altepetl in central Mexico: the Nahuatl and Spanish annals and accounts collected by don Domingo de San Antón Muñón Chimalpahin Quauhtlehuanitzin. Edited and translated by Arthur J. O. Anderson and Susan Schroeder. Norman: University of Oklahoma Press. pp. 25–177. ISBN 0-8061-2921-2.
