= Tlacopan =

Former city-state in the Valley of Mexico

- 1428–1521
- Glyph

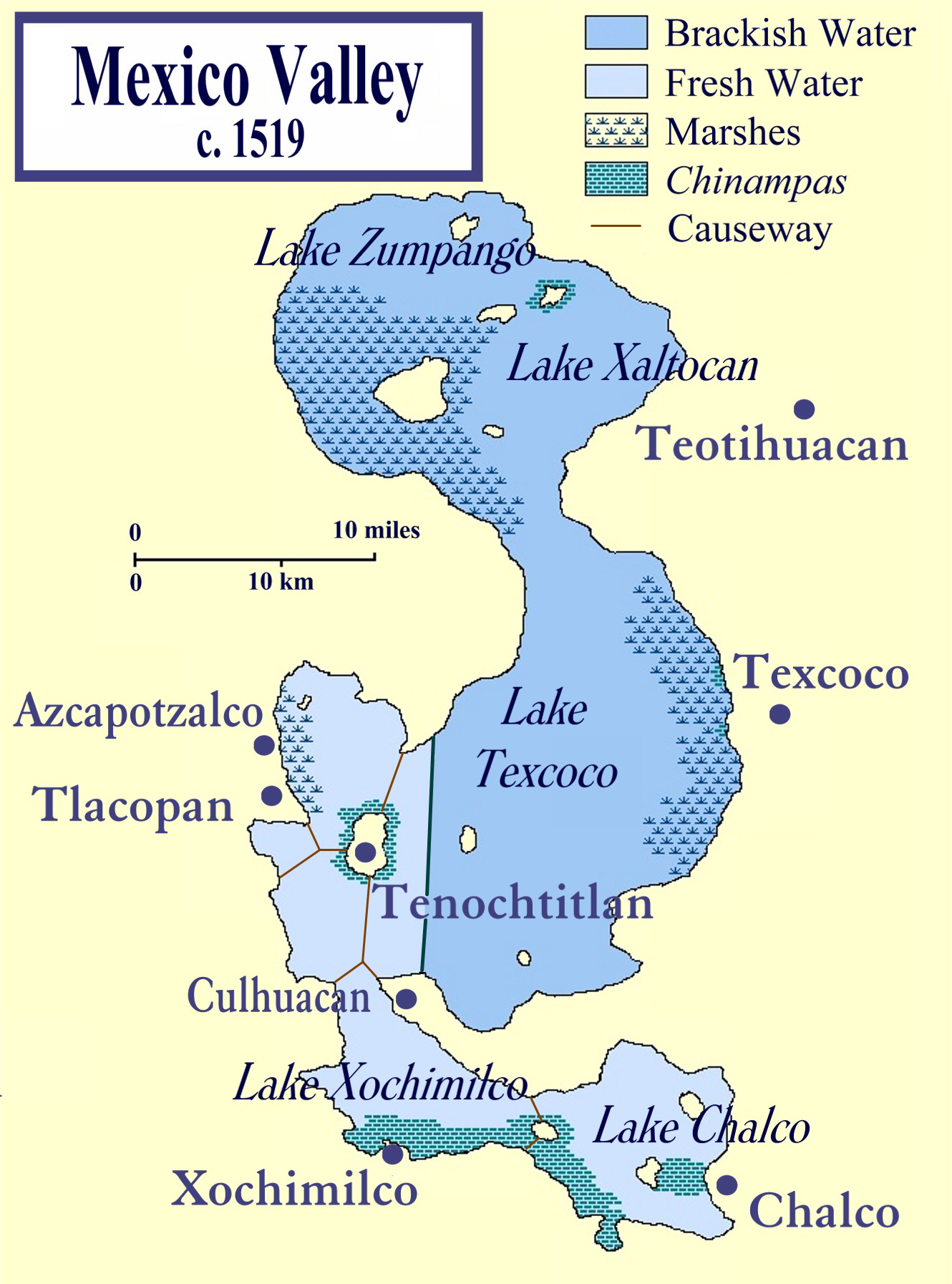
- This map Valley of Mexico at the time of the Spanish conquest shows Tlacopan in relation to Tenochtitlan and other cities in the Valley of Mexico.
- Common languages: Classical Nahuatl
- Religion: Aztec religion
- Historical era: Pre-Columbian
  - Formation of the Aztec Empire: 1428
  - Spanish conquest of the Aztec Empire: 1521
Succeeded by
New Spain

Tlacopan, also called Tacuba, (Classical Nahuatl: Tlacōpan, [t͡ɬaˈkóːpan̥], Otomian languages: Abotto, 'in the forest of trees') was a Tepanec / Mexica altepetl on the western shore of Lake Texcoco. The site is today the neighborhood of Tacuba, in Mexico City.

== Etymology ==
The name comes from Classical Nahuatl tlacōtl, "stem" or "rod" and -pan, "place in or on" and roughly translates to "place on the rods"),

== History ==
Tlacopan was a Tepanec city-state, originally subordinate to nearby Azcapotzalco.

In 1428, after its successful conquest of Azcapotzalco, Tlacopan allied with the neighbouring city-states of Tenochtitlan and Texcoco, thus becoming a member of the Aztec Triple Alliance and resulting in the subsequent birth of the Aztec Empire.

Aculnahuacatl Tzaqualcatl, the son of the Tepanec ruler, Tezozomoc, was installed as tlatoani of Tlacopan until his death in c.1430. Throughout its existence, Tlacopan was to remain a minor polity within the Triple Alliance. It received only a fifth of tribute earned from joint campaigns with its more powerful allies.

In 1521, the Aztec Empire collapsed as a result of the Spanish conquest of Mexico, led by Hernán Cortés and his native Tlaxcallan allies. Over the next few centuries, Tlacopan has been assimilated into the sprawling mega-metropolis of Mexico City. The archæological site of Tlacopan is located in Tacuba, within the present-day municipality of Miguel Hidalgo.

== Culture ==
According to Francisco Cervantes de Salazar, six languages were spoken in Tlacopan: Nahuatl ("though corrupt by virtue of being spoken in the mountains"), Otomi, "Guata" (likely a corruption of quata, an old designation for Matlatzinca), Mazahua, "Chuchumé" (likely a Popolocan language), and Chichimec (likely either Pame or Chichimeca Jonaz).

== Rulers of Tlacopan ==
- Aculnahuacatl Tzaqualcatl (c. 1427)
- Totoquihuaztli I (c. 1428), often considered the first tlatoani of Tlacopan; co-founder of the Aztec Triple Alliance.
- Chimalpopoca (?–?)
- Totoquihuatzin (?–1519)
- Tetlepanquetzal (1519–1525), son of Totoquihuatzin.

Tlacopan was mostly leaderless from 1526 to 1550; the de facto ruler was Isabel Moctezuma since the city was part of her encomienda. Business in the city were handled by various appointed governors and nobles unrelated to the previous dynasty.

- Don Antonio Cortés Totoquihuaztli the Elder (c. 1550–1574), descendant of the pre-colonial tlatoani. Made tlatoani after Isabel Moctezuma's death.

== See also ==
- The other leaders of the Triple Alliance:
  - List of tlatoque of Tenochtitlan
  - List of tlatoque of Tetzcoco
- History of the Aztecs
- Other rulers to the south:
  - Maya monarchs
  - Mixtec monarchs
