= Tzilacatzin =

Nahua-Otomi Warrior

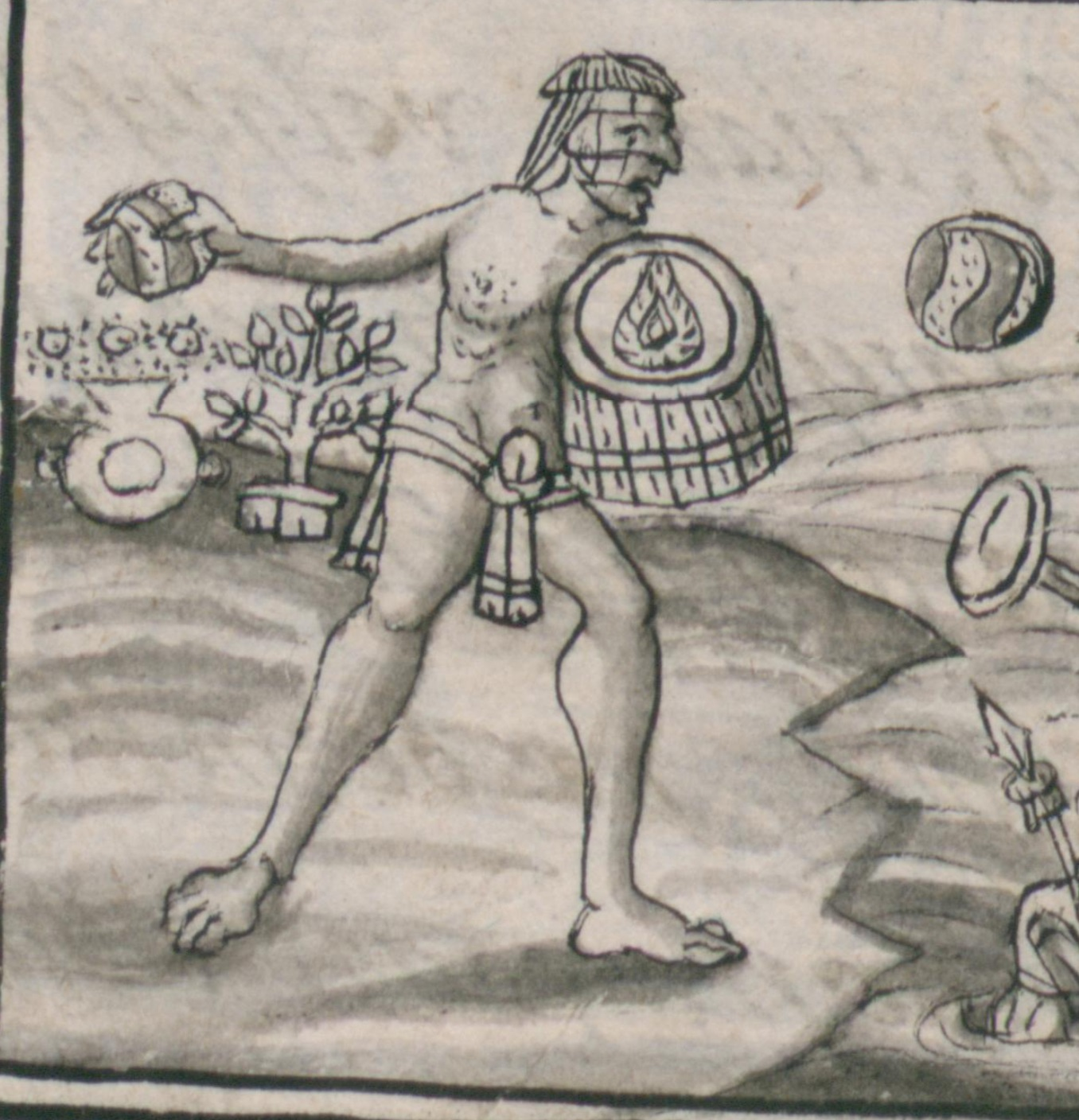
Tzilacatzin as depicted in the Florentine Codex.

Tzilacatzin was a Tlatelolca warrior. A member of the Otomi or Otontin warrior class, he became famous as a hero during the fall of Tenochtitlan.

In an account that described the Spaniards' entry into Tlatelolco, Tzilacatzin was identified as one of the three brave warriors who led the Tlatelolca side, along with Tzoyectzin and Temoctzin. Bernardino de Sahagún's Tlatelolca informants describe that during the siege Spanish brigantines led by Pedro de Alvarado landed on the island where Tlatelolco was situated. Initially the warriors did not dare attack them but Tzilacatzin who was strong of arm killed several Spaniards by throwing stones at them.

The Spaniards focused their fire on Tzilacatzin but he cleverly evaded it and proceeded to disguise as a common soldier in order to not attract attention. He was also said to have used different implements to change his appearance such as a hairpiece made of eagle feathers and accessories (e.g. golden earplug, shell necklace, lip pendant). At other times he fought without armor or head protection in order to intimidate the Spaniards with his valor.

Later when brigantines landed in the district called Xocotitlan, they were forced to return to the boats and flee by Tzilacatzin and his men. He is also described as one of only three warriors not being fearful when confronted by the Spanish invaders.

"And when they got to Nonoalco, there was fighting and skirmishing; the scene filled with combat and battle. There were deaths on both sides; equal numbers of the Mexica and their enemies were hit. Thus on both sides there were wounded, and the fighting went on day and night. There were only two great warriors who did not hide their faces, who thought nothing of their enemies, who did not place value on their bodies. The first was named Tzoyectzin and the second Temoctzin. A third was the already mentioned Tzilacatzin. When the Spaniards tired, when they were unable to do anything with the Mexica, unable to penetrate them, they went away. They entered [their quarters] in very low spirits, their auxiliaries following after them. Temoctzin, and the third Tzilacatzin, who was already mentioned. When the Spaniards saw that night was coming and they were gaining nothing, they returned to their base with their Indian friends."
