= Totoquihuaztli I =

Totoquihuatzli I
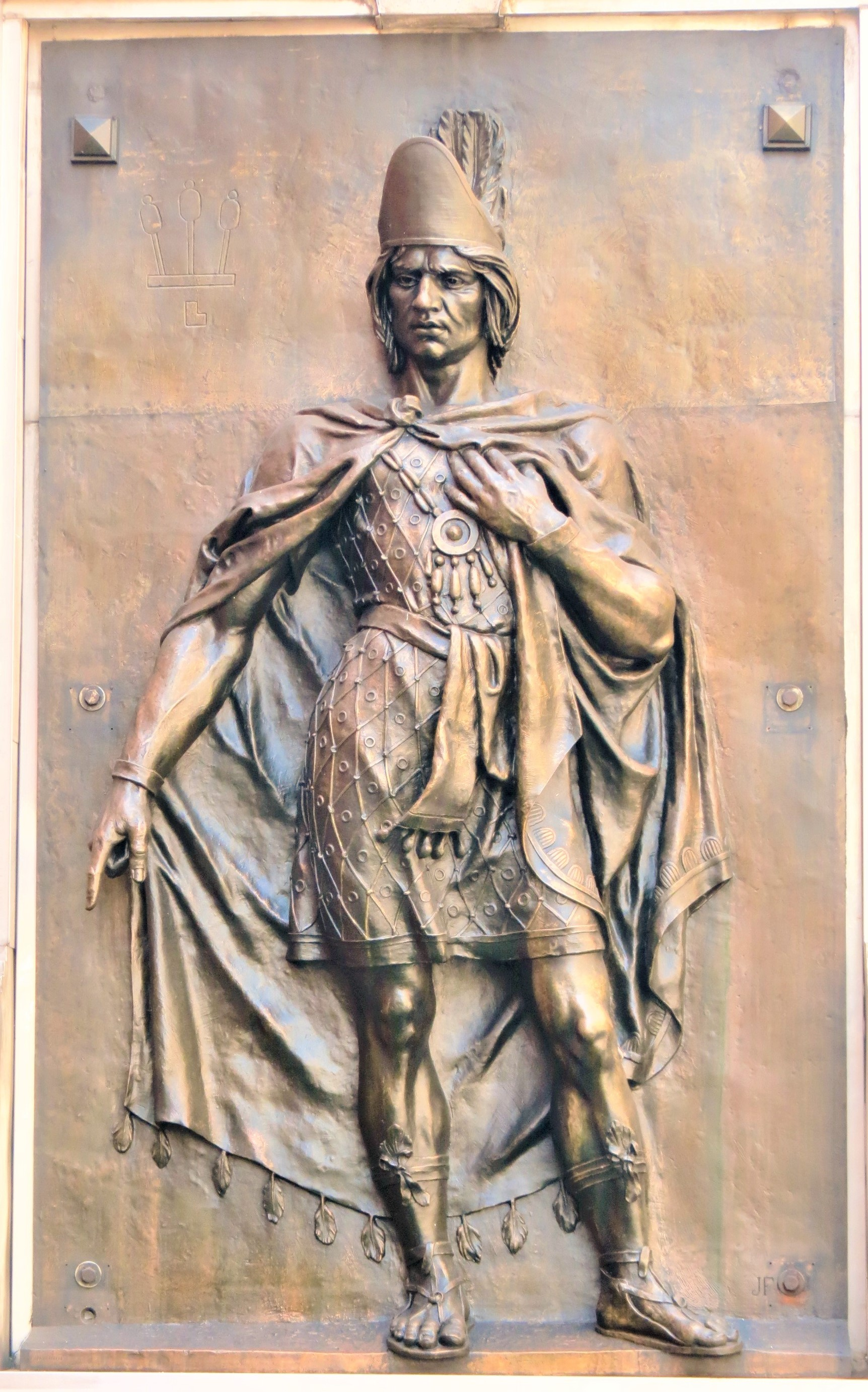
- Relief of Totoquihuatztli at the Garden of the Triple Alliance, Mexico City

Tlatoani of Tlacopan
- Reign: 1430 – 1469
- Predecessor: Aculnahuacatl Tzaqualcatl
- Successor: Chimalpopoca
- Died: 1469
Names
- Totoquihuatzli, Totoquihuatzin I

Totoquihuatzin I was a tlatoani (ruler) of the pre-Columbian Tepanec altepetl (ethnic state) of Tlacopan in the Valley of Mexico.

It was during the reign of Totoquihuatzin I that the foundation of the Triple Alliance was formed, including the distribution of territory and share of tribute between Tlacopan, Tenochtitlan and Texcoco.

In 1440 Totoquihuatzin I participated in the selection of Moctezuma I to succeed Itzcoatl. Then again in 1466 Totoquihuatzin I participated in the selection of Axayacatl to succeed Moctezuma I as the next tlatoani of Tenochtitlan.

== Notes ==
Preceded by Aculnahuacatl Tzaqualcatl	Tlatoani of Tlacopan; 1430-1469	Succeeded by Chimalpopoca
