= Tlacochcalcatl =

Aztec military rank

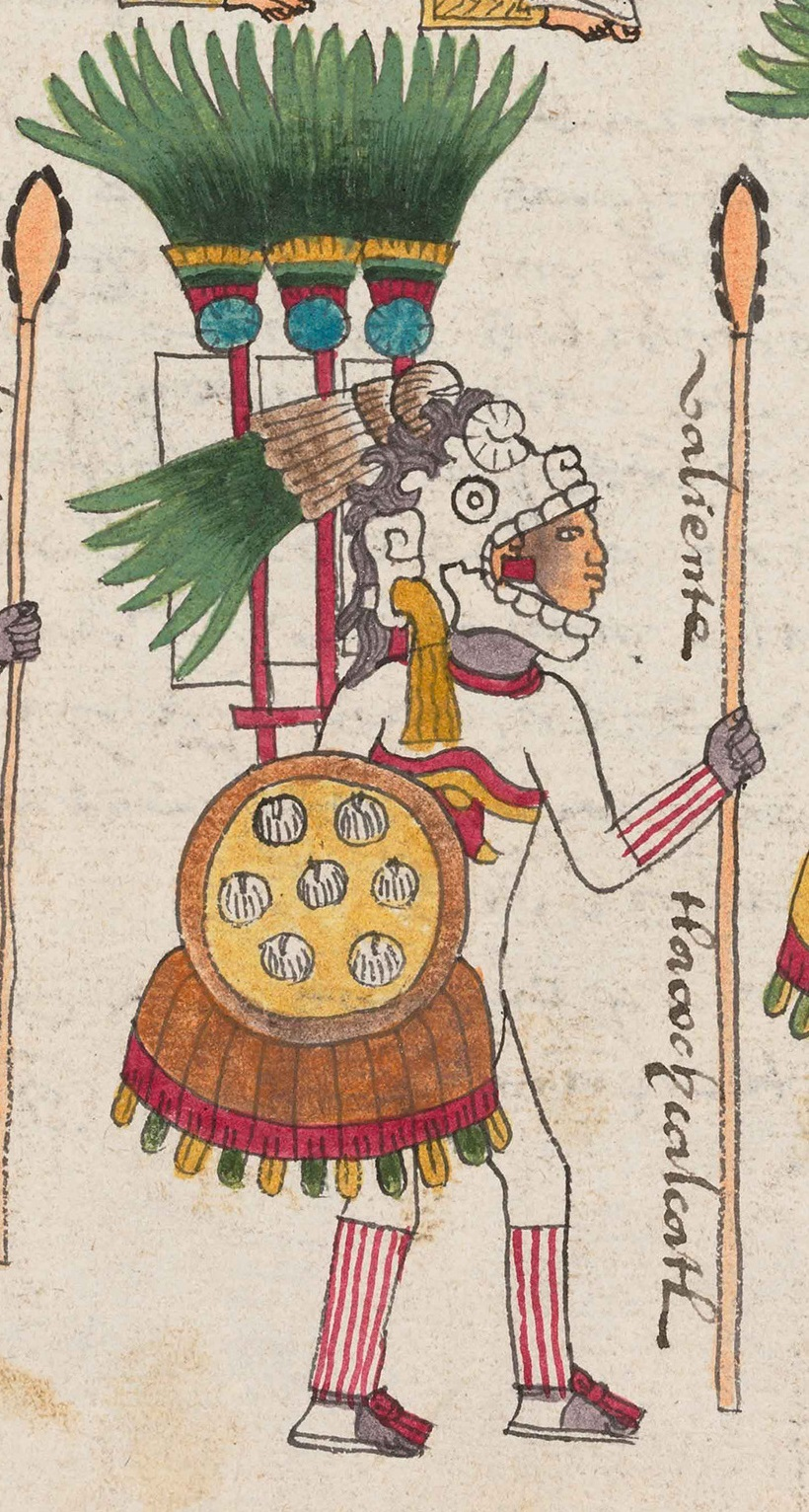
A tlacochcalcatl pictured in the Codex Mendoza folio 67r. He is brandishing a shield (chimalli) and a lance (tepoztopilli), he wears a skull helmet, dyed cotton armour and has a banner (pamitl) on his back

Tlacochcalcatl (Nahuatl pronunciation: [t͡ɬakotʃˈkaɬkat͡ɬ] "The man from the house of darts") was an Aztec military title or rank; roughly equivalent to the modern title of field marshal. In Aztec warfare the tlacochcalcatl was second in command only to the tlatoani and he usually led the Aztec army into battle when the ruler was otherwise occupied. Together with the tlacateccatl (general), he was in charge of the Aztec army and undertook all military decisions and planning once the tlatoani had decided to undertake a campaign.

The tlacochcalcatl was also in charge of the tlacochcalco. Tlacochcalco ("in the house of darts") was the name of four armories placed at the four entries to the ceremonial precinct of the Aztec capital Tenochtitlan. These mains armories were stocked with new weapons every year (during the festival of Quecholli), and one account by the Spanish conquistador Andrés de Tapia estimates the number of weapons found in each of the four armories to be "500 cartloads".

The tlacochcalcatl was always a member of the military order of the cuachicqueh "the shorn ones".

The office of tlacochcalcatl was often the last step towards becoming the next tlatoani.

The first tlacochcalcatl was instated under the rule of Huitzilihuitl who appointed his brother Itzcoatl who probably also served during the rule of Chimalpopoca. When Itzcoatl became tlatoani he appointed Tlacaelel as tlacochcalcatl and Moctezuma Ilhuicamina as tlacateccatl; when Tlacaelel was appointed cihuacoatl, Moctezuma Ilhuicamina was promoted to tlacochcalcatl. It is not known who was tlacochcalcatl under the rule of Moctezuma I; possibly Tlacaelel held a dual office in this period. Under the rule of Moctezuma Ilhuicamina's son and successor Axayacatl, the tlacochcalcatl was Tizoc, who in turn became ruler at Axayacatl's death. Tizoc who was seen as a weak ruler; he was disposed of and his tlacochcalcatl Ahuitzotl became ruler. Ahuitzotl's tlacochcalcatl was the next ruler: Moctezuma II (Xocoyotzin). The tlacochcalcatl of Moctezuma II at the arrival of the Spaniards was Quappiatl.
