= Aculnahuacatl Tzaqualcatl =

Aculnahuacatl

Tlatoani of Tlacopan
- Successor: Totoquihuaztli I
- Born: c. 14th century
- Died: c. 1430
- Spouse: Tlacochcuetzin
- Issue: Coauoxtli; Oquetzal
Names
- Aculnahuacatl Tzaqualcatl
- Father: Tezozomoc

Aculnahuacatl Tzaqualcatl was the first tlatoani (ruler) of the pre-Columbian Tepanec altepetl (ethnic state) of Tlacopan in the Valley of Mexico.

Aculnahuacatl was a son of Tezozomoc, the ruler of Azcapotzalco, who installed him as ruler of Tlacopan. He married Tlacochcuetzin, the daughter of Tlacacuitlahuatzin, the ruler of Tiliuhcan, and had two sons: Coauoxtli and Oquetzal.

"Acolnahuacatl" was part of an anti-Mexica coalition to drive the then-nomadic tribe off or exterminate them.

== Notes ==
Preceded by —	Tlatoani of Tlacopan	Succeeded by Totoquihuaztli I
