= Otomi (military) =

Aztec military order

The Otomi or Otontin were an elite Aztec military order, named after the Otomi people.

The Otomies (Otontin) were another warrior society who took their name after the Otomi people who were renowned for their fierce fighting. In the historical sources it is often difficult to discern whether the word otomitl "Otomi" refers to members of the Aztec warrior society, or members of the Otomí ethnic group who also often joined the Aztec armies as mercenaries or allies.

One famous member of the Otomi was Tzilacatzin.

== See also ==
- Aztec warfare

== Works cited ==
- Clendinnen, Inga (March 31, 2010). The Cost of Courage in Aztec Society: Essays on Mesoamerican Society and Culture. Cambridge University Press. ISBN 9780521518116.
- Trombold, Charles D. (November 28, 1991). Ancient Road Networks and Settlement Hierarchies in the New World. Cambridge University Press. ISBN 0521383374.
- Rajagopalan, Angela Herren (2019). Portraying the Aztec Past: The Codices Boturini, Azcatitlan, and Aubin. Austin, TX: University of Texas Press. p. 79. ISBN 9781477316061.
