= Opochtli =

Aztec Deity

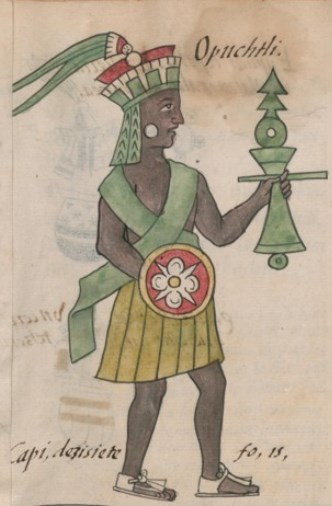

Opochtli (Nahuatl pronunciation: [/ˈoːpoːt͡ʃt͜ɬi/]) was one of the gods of the Aztec pantheon. He was considered the god of fishing and hunting, and commonly seen riding a dolphin as well as one of the representatives of the rain god Tlaloc. In Nahuatl, his name means The Left or The Left-Handed. He was the god who threw his spear with his left hand. Since the Aztecs saw the west as the primary cardinal point, the south was on the left according to their orientation. Opochtli was therefore also associated with the south. He is said to have invented the atlatl, the net, the canoe pole, and the bird snare.
