= Tetlepanquetzal =

King of Tlacopan

Tlatoani of Tlacopan
- Reign: 1503 – 1525
- Died: 1525; Itzamkanac, Acalan, Mexico
Names
- Tetlepanquetzaltzin

Tetlepanquetzal (died 1525) was the fourth Tepanec tlatoani (ruler) of Tlacopan, and reigned after 1503 as a tributary of the Mexican emperor Moctezuma II, whom he assisted in the first defence of Mexico. Afterward he was one of the principal auxiliaries of Cuauhtémoc. When the city was finally taken, 13 August 1521, he was made prisoner and tortured, together with Cuauhtémoc, by the Spaniards to coerce them into revealing the hiding place of the imperial treasure.

Tetlepanquetzal was present when Hernán Cortés met Moctezuma II for the first time.

== Death ==
When Hernán Cortés marched in October, 1524 to Honduras to subdue the revolt of Cristóbal de Olid, he carried Tetlepanquetzal with him, in addition to the Aztec emperor Cuauhtémoc, and another tlatoani, Coanacotzin (of Texcoco), for fear of an insurgency while he was away. During the expedition, under the pretext that he had discovered a conspiracy against him, Cortés had all three strangled or hanged, with others, during Lent, 1525.

Preceded by Antonio Cortés Totoquihuatzin	Tlatoani of Tlacopan	Succeeded by
