= Chimalpopoca (Tlacopan) =

Tlatoani of Tlacopan
- Reign: 1469 – 1489
- Coronation: 1469
- Successor: Antonio Cortés Totoquihuatzin
- Born: c. 1397
- Died: c. 1489
- Issue: Antonio Cortés Totoquihuatzin
Names
- Chimalpopotzin of Tlacopan

Chimalpopoca (died in the year 10 House (1489)) was the third tlatoani (ruler) of the Tepanec city-state of Tlacopan. Chimalpopoca attended the festivities of the opening of the last phase of the Templo Mayor in 1487.

He proclaimed his son, Totoquihuatzli II, as his successor before his death in 1489.

Preceded by Totoquihuaztli I	Tlatoani of Tlacopan; 1469–1489	Succeeded by Totoquihuatzli II
