= Tlacaelel =

- Tlacochcalcatl of Tenochtitlan
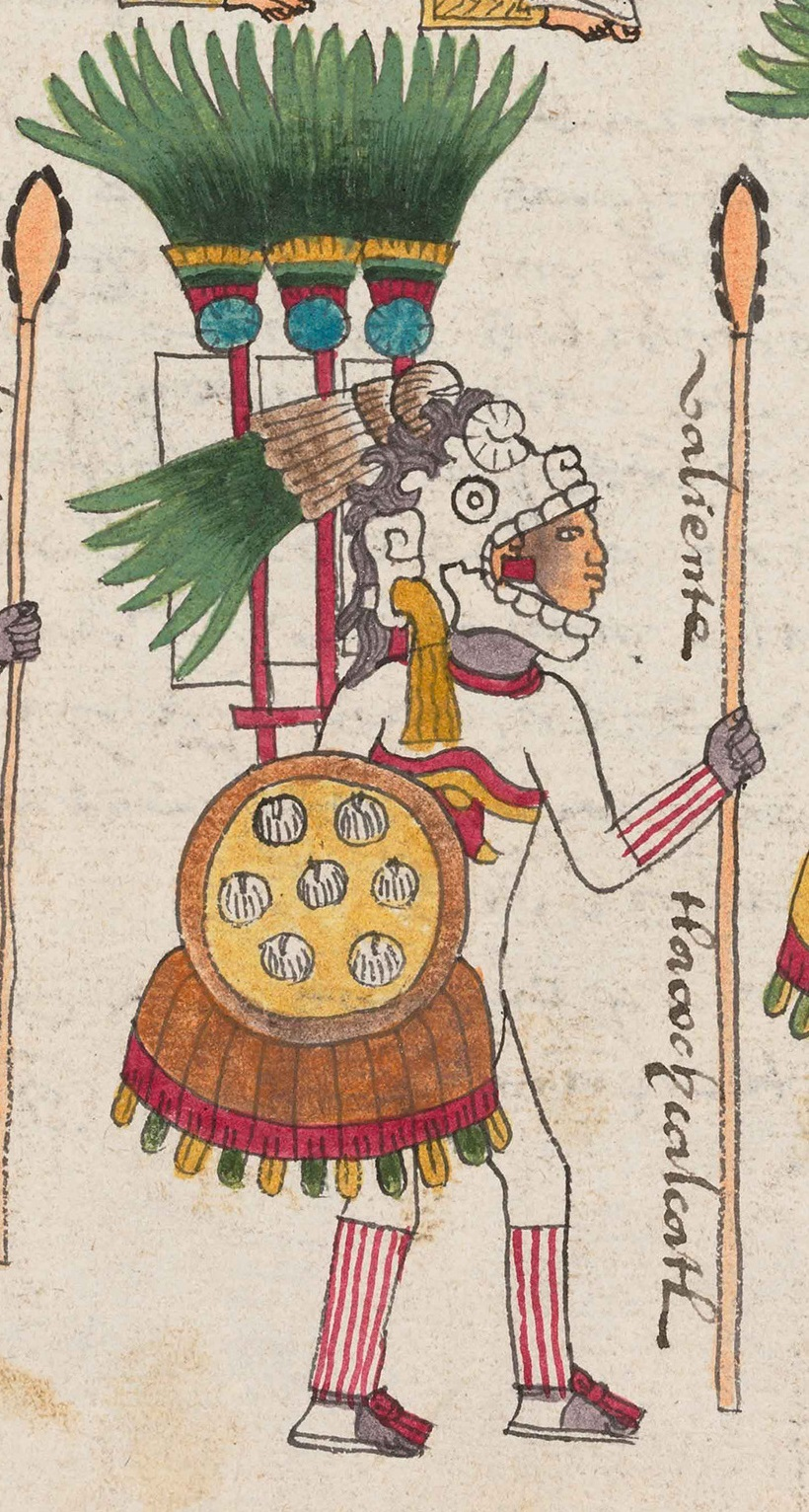
- Tlacaelel was a tlacochcalcatl. Picture from Codex Mendoza.
- Born: 1397; Tenochtitlan
- Died: 1487 (aged 89-90); Aztec Empire
- Spouse: Maquiztzin
- Issue: Cacamatzin; Tlilpotoncatzin; Xiuhpopocatzin; Acihuapoltzin
- Father: Emperor Huitzilihuitl
- Mother: Queen Cacamacihuatl

Tlacaelel I (1397 – 1487) (Classical Nahuatl: Tlācaēllel Nahuatl pronunciation: [t͡ɬaːkaˈeːlːel], "Man of Strong Emotions," from "tlācatl," person and "ēllelli," strong emotion) was the principal architect of the Aztec Triple Alliance and hence the Mexica (Aztec) empire. He was the son of Emperor Huitzilihuitl and Queen Cacamacihuatl, nephew of Emperor Itzcoatl, father of poet Macuilxochitzin, and brother of Emperors Chimalpopoca and Moctezuma I.

During the reign of his uncle Itzcoatl, Tlacaelel was given the office of Tlacochcalcatl, but during the war against the Tepanecs in the late 1420s, he was promoted to first adviser to the ruler, a position called Cihuacoatl in Nahuatl, an office that Tlacaelel held during the reigns of four consecutive Tlatoque, until his death in 1487.

Tlacaelel recast or strengthened the concept of the Aztecs as a chosen people, elevated the tribal god/hero Huitzilopochtli to top of the pantheon of gods, and increased militarism. In tandem with this, Tlacaelel is said to have increased the level and prevalence of human sacrifice, particularly during a period of natural disasters that started in 1446 (according to Diego Durán). Durán also states that it was during the reign of Moctezuma I, as an invention of Tlacaelel that the flower wars, in which the Aztecs fought Tlaxcala and other Nahuan city-states, were instigated.

To strengthen the Aztec nobility, he helped create and enforce sumptuary laws, prohibiting commoners from wearing certain adornments such as lip plugs, gold armbands, and cotton cloaks. He also instigated a policy of burning the books of conquered peoples with the aim of erasing all memories of a pre-Aztec past.

When he dedicated the seventh reconstruction of the Templo Mayor in Tenochtitlan, Tlacaelel had brought his nation to the height of its power. The dedication took place in 1484 and was celebrated with the sacrifice of many war captives. After Tlacaelel's death in 1487, the Mexica Empire continued to expand north into the Gran Chichimeca and south toward the Maya lands.

== In popular culture ==
He was the inspiration for the main character in the novel, Tlacaelel, El Azteca entre los Aztecas, (1979) by Mexican author Antonio Velasco Piña.

Amado Zumaya plays Tlacaelel in the 1990 film Return to Aztlán written and directed by Juan Mora Catlett.

Preceded by Itzcoatl	Tlacochcalcatl	Succeeded by Moctezuma I
Preceded by none	Cihuacoatl	Succeeded by Tlilpotonqui
