= Cihuacoatl (position) =

Prime Minister of the Aztec Empire

The cihuacoatl (Classical Nahuatl: cihuācōātl [siwaːˈkoːaːtɬ], for "female serpent") was a supreme leader under the Tlatoani (Aztec emperor), or an esteemed advisor, within the Aztec Empire system of government.

The prefix cihua- is a reference to women in Nahuatl, and Cihuacōātl was also the name of a Aztec goddess.

== Officeholders ==
- Tlacaelel (1420s–1487); office created for him
- Tlilpotoncatzin (1487–1503)
- Tlacaelel II (1503–1520)
- Matlatzincatzin (1520)
- Tlacotzin (1520–1525); final officeholder

== In popular culture ==
The position features in four historical novels by Simon Levack.

== See also ==
- Class in Aztec society
