= Tezozomoctli (Cuauhtitlan) =

Tlatoani of Cuauhtitlan
- Reign: 4 Rabbit – 3 Rabbit; 1418–1430
- Predecessor: Xaltemoctzin
- Successor: Tecocoatzin
- Born: Tlatelolco
- Died: 1430; Atzompan
- Father: Tlacateotl
- Mother: Xiuhtomiyauhtzin

Tezozomoctli (originally Teçoçomoctli; ruled 1418–1430) was a tlatoani ("ruler" or "king") of the pre-Columbian Nahua altepetl (city-state) of Cuauhtitlan in central Mexico. His palace was located at Huexocalco.

Tezozomoctli was born in the Mexica city of Tlatelolco. His father was Tlacateotl, who was the second tlatoani of Tlatelolco. His mother was Xiuhtomiyauhtzin, the daughter of the tlatoani of Coatl Ichan, Acolmiztli. Tezozomoctli was probably named after his great-grandfather, the powerful ruler of Azcapotzalco.

In the Tepanec War in the year 3 Rabbit (1430), Cuauhtitlan was attacked and defeated by the combined forces of the surrounding peoples. After being informed at his refuge at Cincoc Huehuetocan that Cuauhtitlan had been captured, Tezozomoctli travelled to Atzompan where he allegedly committed suicide by poison.

Ancestors of Tezozomoctli (Cuauhtitlan)

Huehue Tezozomoctli
Quaquapitzahuac
Tzihuacxochitzin I
Tlacateotl
Acolmiztli
Acxocueitl
Tlazozomizqui
Tezozomoctli (Cuauhtitlan)
Tzompantzin
Acolmiztli
Xiuhtomiyauhtzin

== Notes ==
Preceded by Xaltemoctzin	Tlatoani of Cuauhtitlan; 4 Rabbit – 3 Rabbit; 1418–1430	Succeeded by Tecocoatzin
