= Copilco =

Mesoamerican city

- Interactive map of Copilco
- 19°20′08″N 99°10′36″W
- Periods: Preclassical Mesoamerican
- Cultures: Chichimeca – Tepaneca - Cuicuilca
- Location: Coyoacán, Mexico City; Mexico

History
- Built: 600 to 100 CE.

Copilco was an important Mesoamerican ceremonial center, southwest of Mexico City, Mexico. Copilco is located approximately four kilometers north of Cuicuilco. Both were covered by lava from several eruptions of the Xitle volcano three thousand years ago.

It is very likely that founding, development and destiny of both cities had common causes, from their geographical location, and chronology.

The area is located on the west side of Coyoacán or Coyohuacán (Nahuatl: coyō-hua-cān, 'place of coyotes') in the area covered by the lava from the Xitle volcano (according to Chronicles, one eruption of the volcano occurred on April 24, 76).

== Founding ==
There are several theories regarding its founding; some historical records may establish Copilco's founding in the year 100 BCE. Another version places it at 500 BCE.

== Background ==
Copilco was one of the first and most important ceremonial centers in the Valley of Mexico. In the mid-Preclassical (800 BC), several villages developed in this place and slowly evolved and grew, becoming cities and eventually major civic-ceremonial urban centers in the late-preclassical period (ca. 100 CE.). As urban centers, these were very important, with an advanced and hierarchized society. Copilco's decline began early in the 1st century BCE, with the increasing rise of Teotihuacán as an important cultural and religious center. By 400 CE, the Xitle volcano near the Ajusc erupted, burying and destroying what still remained of Cuicuilco and Copilco as important ceremonial centers. Lava spread in an area of 13 by 15 kilometers of what is today known as “Pedregal de San Ángel”. This disaster dispersed the population to Toluca and Teotihuacan.

Copilco was an altépetl and ceremonial center located on the shores of the Texcoco Lake. It had an incipient agriculture with an economy based on maize, hunting and fishing and the inhabitants supplemented their diet with amphibians, insects and mammals from the nearby forest. This area was explored by Dr. Manuel Gamio in 1917 and a burial site was found covered by lava from the eruption. Gamio made three tunnels under the lava, finding a cultural sequence and bone remains from three individuals, containing offerings consisting of pottery, vessels, clay figurines, and Metates. Human remains are known as the “Hombre del Pedregal”. Several tunnels have been made, finding places with corpses occupying their original location, surrounded by funerary offerings items, such as ceramic ware.

== History ==
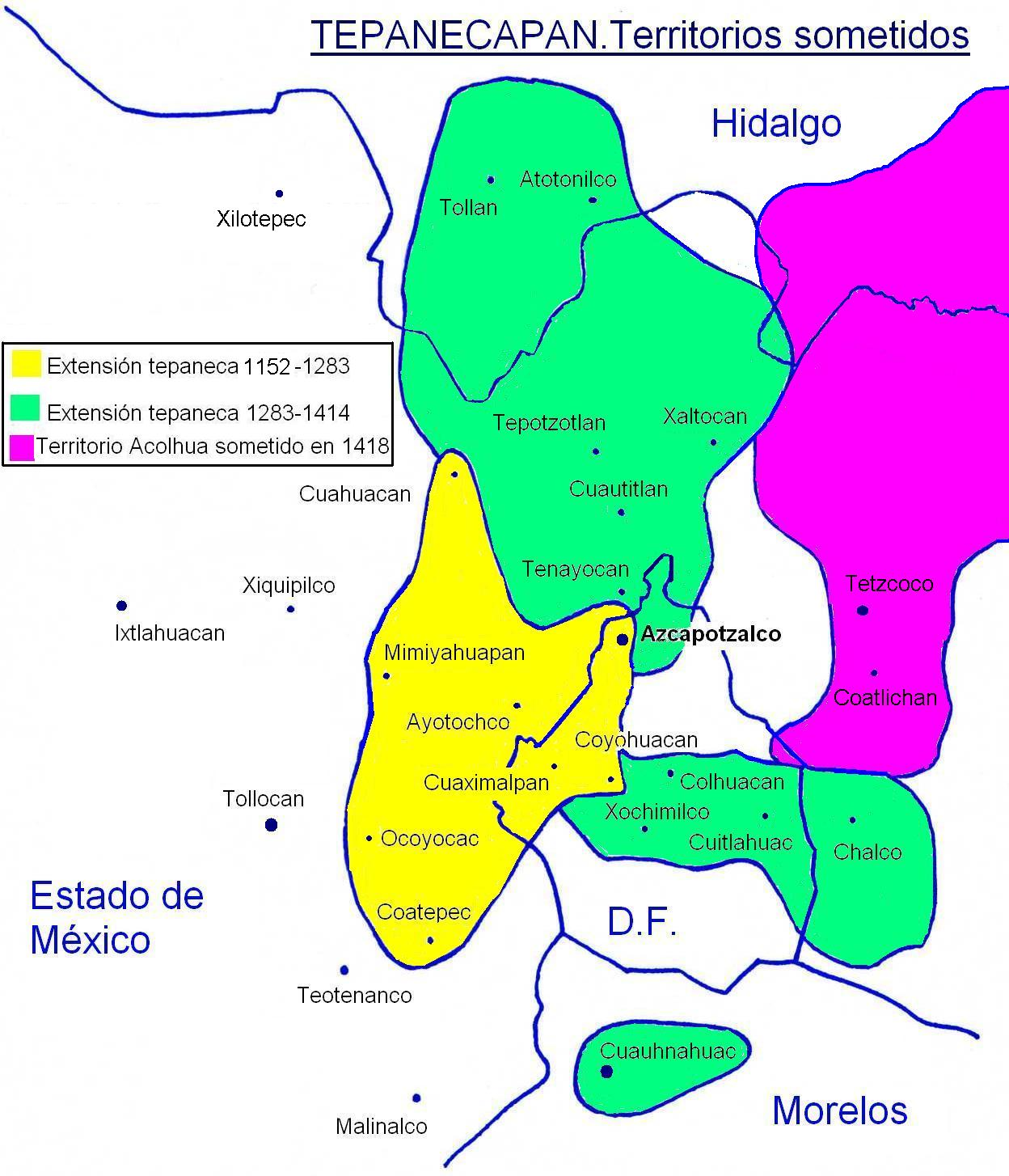
Maximum Tepaneca Expansion.

It is very likely that there were several population eras, for all areas of the Valley of Mexico, which could be related to the different cultures that inhabited the area at different times, and the results of the different wars, conquests and alliances. It will be necessary for specialists and scholars to conclude their important research and build an up-to-date overview of the history of the Valley of Mexico. There is evidence of occupation of this area since the Preclassical period.

In the specific case of Copilco, from what is known, it is estimated that at during the late prehispanic Mesoamerican chronology (1332), Copilco was tributary to Azcapotzalco, and therefore the Tepanec, who in turn were somehow descendants of the Chichimecs.

The Tepanecs formed a culture with political, social and military organization; settled in Azcapotzalco, they dominated minor villages establishing their culture in Coyoacan around 1332 CE. Their growth continued by their taking of other villages: Copilco, Quiahuac ("Los Reyes"), Xotepingo, Tepetlapan and Coapan.

=== Tepanecs ===
Tepaneca can be translated as “the stone People”. This definition is supported by the fact that the Tepanec Glyph appears on several documents (Boturini Codex or “Tira de la peregrinación”, Azcatitlan and Xolotl Codexes), which, associated with the calli glyph, portray the idea of a “nation” or human group, appear one of the most normalized Nahuatl glyphs, the one meaning "piedra" (stone).

Name is a derivation of the real people name, from their original mythic city, Tepanohuayan "the pasadero", also called Tepano whose name is tepaneca (tl). Graphically it is represented by a stone, hence the etymology of Tepan is created "on the stones". Tepanec conquered territories were called “Tepanecapan” (“tepanecas land", literally "over the tepanecas").

=== Origin ===
According to chronicler Fernando de Alva Cortés Ixtlilxochitl (1568–1648), this was a Chichimec group, that settled in 1012 CE in the western region of the Texcoco Lake. Their lineage begins when their leader Acolhua marries Cuetlaxochitzin, daughter of Xólotl, another Chichimeca leader.

Domingo Francisco de San Antón Muñón Chimalpahin Quauhtlehuanitzin (1579–1660) establishes this settlement before, at 995 CE. In fact archaeological investigations have revealed that Azcapotzalco was inhabited from the classical period (around 600 CE) and were related to the Teotihuacan’s in culture and language, as it is known the spoke otomíana language in the 14th century while the Nahuatl was lingua franca from 1272. Continuing with data provided by Chimalpain, he mentions that the tepanecas entered a triple alliance from 1047 (this alliance is different from that with the Mexicas, much later).

The Register establish that the last lineage begins with Matlacohuatl, who ruled from 1152 to 1222, married to Cuitlachtepetl. The second tlatoani was Chiconquiauhtzin, married to Xicomoyahual, daughter of Ohpantzin.

He was succeeded by Tezcapoctzin, who ruled from 1248 to 1283. In his time the mexitin appeared, who requested permission to found their second capital on the islet of Lake Texcoco; it was originally named Cuauhmixtitlan in 1274. With his rule Tepaneca military expansion began, establishing partnerships with the Acolhua in the Valley of Mexico, the mazahuaques in the Ixtlahuaca Valley and the matlatzincas in the Toluca Valley, while acquiring a great commercial power. In 1272 he accepted the substitution of Coatlinchan by Tetzcoco in the Triple Alliance of that time, thus consolidating the achievements of his predecessor.

=== Language ===
Their language probably had Uto-Aztecan languages and Oto-Manguean languages roots.

However, from the information recollection by Spaniards as of 1521, some sparse information is available about the languages spoken in different Tepanecas cities. Fray Bernardino de Sahagún includes Tepanecas among Nahuatl speaker groups although this claim seems rather a –synchronous, non-historical- attempt, of describing ethnical conditions in times near the Spaniard presence, it is known that the consolidation of major political units of the Central Highlands, also entailed the Nahuatl acceptance as a common pipiltin language of the different altépetl.

=== Chichimecs ===
The Chichimec (Dog lineage or Arc warriors), was a culture which controlled priests, by putting pressure on social nobility which was almost always military and oppressive. These were nomadic groups nourished from hunting, then learned to eat cooked meat and maize; cultivated beans, corn, pumpkin, nopales, oilseeds, among other things. They believed in various gods as Quetzalcoatl, Tezcatlipoca, Mimixcotal and Mixcoatl. They thought that the stars were warriors killed in battles, honoring the Sun.

They continued the Toltec art as can be seen in the Tenayuca pyramid. As well as their sculpture as for example the "Espejo de la Cruz", the mantle braided with fur and various ceramic figures. Left the great Tenayuca pyramid as cultural contribution. The chichimeca disappeared since the Tepanec defeated and the only leader left was Netzahualcoyotl who fled with the tlaxcaltecas.

== Site ==
Manuel Gamio recounts the following: "... in the month of August 1917..." the staff proceeded to make a methodical recognition all quarries being exploited... realizing that where more items were available, was at Copilco, bordering “Colonia del Carmen in San Ángel ".

From that place many archaeological vestiges and human remains were extracted. He noted:

The archaeological vestiges discovered in four tunnels that were excavated in Copilco can be categorized in three groups: 1° Sepulcher;" 2 ° Pavements and stone rows; 3 ° Objects of mud and stone.

The tombs consist of cylindrical hollows excavated in tepetate...

Not all skeletons were buried in cylindrical graves... also found bones inside a vase"
