= Tzihuacxochitzin I =

- Queen consort of Azcapotzalco
- Husband: King Tezozomoc
- Issue: Epcoatzin; Icel Azcatl; Itzpapalocihuatl; Aculnahuacatl Tzaqualcatl; Tlacochcuecihuatl; Chichilocuili; Maxtla; Xaltemoctzin; Xiuhcanahualtzin; Quaquapitzahuac
- Father: Huitzilaztatzin

Tzihuacxochitzin I was a Queen consort of Azcapotzalco as a wife of the king Tezozomoc, who was very famous.

She was a daughter of the noble dignitary called Huitzilaztatzin. She married Tezozomoc, and it is mentioned by Chimalpahin that they had ten children:

- Epcoatzin
- Icel Azcatl
- Itzpapalocihuatl
- Aculnahuacatl Tzaqualcatl
- Tlacochcuecihuatl
- Chichilocuili
- Maxtla
- Xaltemoctzin
- Xiuhcanahualtzin
- Quaquapitzahuac

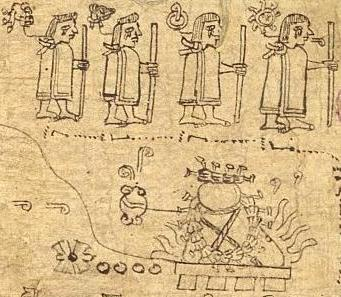
This image shows the funeral of Tzihuacxochitzin's husband.

Xaltemoctzin had a daughter called Tzihuacxochitzin, named after his mother.

Tzihuacxochitzin was a grandmother of Tecollotzin, Tlacateotl, Matlalatzin and Huacaltzintli. It is possible that she was a mother of the queen Ayauhcihuatl, who was a mother of Aztec emperor Chimalpopoca.
