= Chalchiuhcozcatzin =

- Queen consort of Azcapotzalco
- Husband: King Tezozomoc
- Issue: King Tayatzin

Chalchiuhcozcatzin was a Queen of Azcapotzalco as a wife of the famous king Tezozomoc. She was his main wife.

His other wife was the Queen Tzihuacxochitzin I.

Chalchiuhcozcatzin was the mother of king Tayatzin, who ruled for very short time, because his throne was usurped by his half-brother Maxtla.
