= Tayatzin =

- King of Azcapotzalco
- Predecessor: Tezozomoc
- Successor: Maxtla
- Father: Tezozomoc
- Mother: Chalchiuhcozcatzin

Tayatzin, also referred to variously in sources as Quetzalayatzin, Tayahauh, or Tayueh, was a king of the Tepanec city of Azcapotzalco in Mexico.

== Biography ==
He was born as a prince, the son of king Tezozomoc and queen Chalchiuhcozcatzin, who was Tezozomoc's main wife.

His half-siblings were kings Quaquapitzahuac and Maxtla and queen Xiuhcanahualtzin. He was an uncle of Tlacateotl and Emperor Chimalpopoca of Tenochtitlan.

After his father's death, Tayatzin became a king of his city. Maxtla was a king of Coyoacán, but he seized power at Azcapotzalco, leaving the rulership of Coyoacán to his son Tecollotzin.

Chimalpopoca allied with Tayatzin, and the two conspired to retake the throne. Friendly relations between Tenochtitlan and Azcapotzalco were thus replaced by insults and violent intrigue.

Tayatzin was killed, and Chimalpopoca decided to offer himself as a sacrifice at the altar of his father Huitzilíhuitl.
