= Azcapotzalco (disambiguation) =

Azcapotzalco is a borough (alcaldía) of Mexico City.

Azcapotzalco may also refer to:

- Azcapotzalco (former administrative division), a former municipality of the Mexican Federal District
- Azcapotzalco (altepetl), a pre-Columbian polity
- Azcapotzalco metro station, a Mexico City Metro station
