= Acolmiztli (Coatl Ichan) =

- King of Culhuacán
- Spouse: Tlazozomizqui
- Issue: Queen Acxocueitl; Queen Xiuhtomiyauhtzin
- Father: Huetzin, King of Coatlinchan
- Mother: Atotoztli I, Princess of Culhuacan

Acolmiztli I ("Arm of the Puma" in Nahuatl) was a tlatoani (ruler or king) of Coatlichan, Nahua altepetl (city-state).

== Family ==
Acolmiztli was a son of King Huetzin of Coatlinchan and Princess Atotoztli I of Coatlichan. He was married to the Princess Cihuateotzin of Cohuatlichan, who bore him a daughter, the Princess Tozquentzin of Cohuatlichan. Princess Tozquentzin married the King of Texcoco, Techotlalatzin. Acolmiztli was also married to Tlazozomizqui. Their daughters were Queen Acxocueitl and Queen Xiuhtomiyauhtzin.

He was a grandfather of kings Tlacateotl and Tezozomoctli (Cuauhtitlan) and queens Matlalatzin and Huacaltzintli.

== Lineage from Coatlichan ==
This is a family tree of Acolhua's rulers according to Fernando de Alva Ixtlilxochitl, including the Coatlichan's Rulers.

Inside the green boxes is the Coatlichan's lineage with bold text. The others with dates are from the Tetzcoco's lineage.

♀Cuatetzin | Tzontecomatl (Coatlichan) | ♀Pachxochitzin | Tlotzin; 1107-1141
Tlacotzin | ♀Malinalxochitl | ♀ | Nopaltzin | Quinatzin; 1141-1253 | Xiuhquetzal (Tlaxcallan) | Tochin (Huexotzinco?) | ♀Tomiyauh
♀Atototzin (Colhuacan) | Huetzin | Matzicoltzin | Quiauhtzin | Yaotl
Chicomacatzin | ♀Coxxochitzin | Coazanac | Quecholtecpantzin | Tlatonal | Memexoltzin | Acolmiztli | ♀Nenetzin | ♀Cuauhcihuatzin
Coxcox (Colhuacan) | Huitzilihuitl | Mozocomatzin | ♀Tozquetzin | Techotlalatzin; 1253-1357

| | Achitometl (1º señor de Colhuacan) |
| Acamapichtli (Tenochtitlan) | ♀Ilancueitl | ♀Atototzin | Huetzin |
