= Acolnahuacatl =

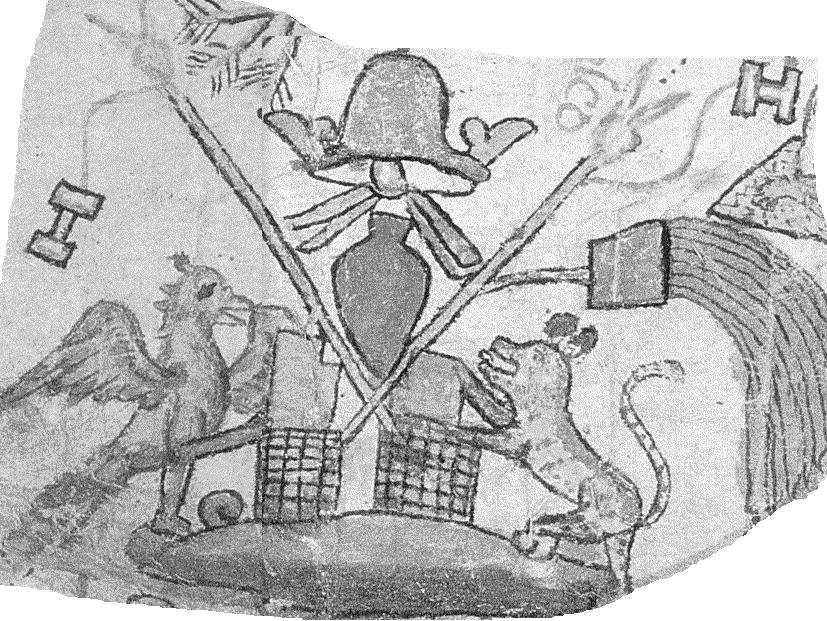
- 17th century glyph to denote Azcapotzalco

Tlatoani of Azcapotzalco
- Reign: 1302–1366/1371
- Predecessor: Xiuhtlatonac
- Successor: Tezozomoc
- Consort: Cuetlaxochitzin
- Issue: Tezozomoc
- Father: Xiuhtlatonac

Acolnahuacatl (also Aculnahuacatl, Acolnahuacatzin) was a king of the Tepanec city of Azcapotzalco. He was likely a son of the king Xiuhtlatonac.

He married princess Cuetlaxochitzin, daughter of king Xolotl. Their son was the famous king Tezozomoc.

According to the historian Chimalpain, Acolnahuacatl ruled from 1302 to 1366 and Tezozomoc from 1367 to 1426. Some contemporary historians placed Acolnahuacatl's death and Tezozómoc's rise in 1371.

Acolnahuacatl was a grandfather to Tayatzin, Maxtla, Xiuhcanahualtzin and Ayauhcihuatl.
