= Acolmiztli =

Acolmiztli may refer to:

- Acolnahuacatl (deity), an Aztec god also known as Acolmiztli
- Nezahualcoyotl, a ruler of Texcoco with the second name Acolmiztli
- Acolmiztli (Coatl Ichan), a ruler of Coatl Ichan
