= Cueva de la Ranchería =

Archaeological site in Chihuahua, Mexico

- Interactive map of Cueva de la Ranchería
- 28°59′40.38″N 108°12′31.75″W
- Type: Archaeological site
- Cultures: Mogollon - Paquimé
- Location: Ciudad Madera, Chihuahua, Mexico

History
- Built: 950—1060 d.C. (?)

Cueva de la Ranchería is an archaeological site located south of Ciudad Madera, in the Sirupa Canyon region, northwest of the Mexican state of Chihuahua.

Ciudad Madera has basic tourism infrastructure, however it may be difficult to get transportation to visit the site, since it covers a large area at the base of the Sirupa Canyon. It is a relatively long drive on a dirt road. It is suggested planning a trip for a minimum of nine to ten hours, with little time to explore. It is also possible to visit the San Andrés Sirupa mission, destroyed by Tarahumaras in 1690. The landscape is particularly beautiful and makes it the trip worthwhile from the Sirupa village. Nearby are thermal hot water springs.

It is advisable to visit the site with an experienced guide.

== First investigations ==
In 1898, Norwegian Explorer Carl Lumholtz was the first provide news about caves in the Madera region, in the north of Sierra Tarahumara. He discovered several sites, among them Cueva del Garabato (scribble), now known as Cuarenta Casas.

Subsequently, several anthropologists and archaeologists briefly explored the region, focusing especially on the outskirts of Cuarenta Casas. Almost all of them published the results of their studies;

- H.A. Carey in 1931.
- E.B. Sayles in 1936
- A.V. Kidder in 1939,
- R.H. Lister in 1946 & 1958
- Eduardo Contreras in 1959
- Arturo Guevara in 1986,
- David Pearson, Fernando Sánchez M. and D, Phillips in 1990.

However, very little is known about the caves; exploration and systematic study is just starting up.

== The Madera Zone ==
Madera was a sawmill that worked lumber extracted in the forests nearby; its greatest attractions are the ancient caves around the region, which served as room and shelter for inhabitants of the Paquimé culture, who built their homes within them.

There are several Paquimé culture archaeological zones in the area of Madera municipality. The most important caves are:

=== Huápoca ===
Located 36 miles west of Madera, on a dirt road.

The Huápoca caves consist of the "Serpiente" and the Nido de Aguila caves. These are considered the most impressive on a cliff. It has complete structures.

It has magnificent views of the Huápoca Canyon.

==== Cueva de la Serpiente ====
It has 14 adobe houses, over 1,000 years old.

==== Nido del águila ====
It only has one house, built on the edge of a sheer cliff under a rocky overhang, provides a meaning to its name.

=== Cueva Grande ===
Located 66 kilometers west of Madera, on a dirt road. Cueva Grande hides within convoluted land and behind branches of trees. The mouth of the cave is obscured by a waterfall from the top of the cave to a stream. There are two, double-story houses (800 years old) that are good examples of the native construction techniques. There is also a round grain storage area behind the structure.

=== La Ranchería ===
Cave complex, 50 kilometers south of Madera. Has an extended archaeological remain area at the base of the Sirupa canyon.

=== Cueva del Puente ===
45 kilometers north of Madera

=== Cuarenta Casas ===
Cuevas El Garabato or Cueva de Las Ventanas, known as Cuarenta Casas was built between 1060 and 1205 CE, residential complex of the Paquimé culture inhabitants.

This complex (located in the Garabato Creek) has a number of constructions and a great cave, guarded by a small waterfall.

=== Cueva de la Momia ===
The mummified body of an adult male, surrounded by offerings such as ceramics, stone utensils, stems and tender corn cobs (elotes) were found inside the cave. The mummy is now in the Capitan Leal Museum in Ciudad Madera. Its conservation condition is excellent.

It is believed that the cave, located very near the Barranca Arroyo del Venado, had more mummies in good condition, but had been destroyed by irresponsible visitors. The cave is divided in two levels, the second level has more than ten rooms in optimal conditions.

=== New Discoveries ===
In one of the Rio Papigochi side canyons, southwest of Madera, is a complex that was inhabited by ancient communities that built homes in the caves and rock shelters. These sites are so safe that to date they are virtually intact.

None of these caves can be easily seen; the only way to know they are there is once one is inside.

==== Cueva de los Fierros ====
Located in the middle of the Canyon slope in an almost vertical wall. Its size is about 30 m and has a complex of at least 10 adobe rooms, some of them in two floors. The whole has a foundation base, as a terrace, on which the rooms were built, the windows are "T" shape, typical paquimé culture.

Almost all rooms are partially destroyed; ceilings still preserved the original wooden structure, inside were found some stone tools such as scrapers, knives, grindstones, fragments of pottery and other objects which could not be identified. There were many olotes found, evidence of corn consumptions and storage.

==== Cueva de la Puerta ====
Located a few hundred meters from the first cave, also found in the middle of the canyon wall. It measures around 25 m and presents vestiges of approximately 12 rooms or enclosures, vandals or treasure hunters partially destroyed floors and walls.

It can be appreciated how ancient houses were built. For construction they used a kind of braided rods and branches of local trees, mainly tascar (local species of Juniper) and Fraxinus, over the braids they shaped the adobe walls. The braid is well preserved, still has the fiber used to fasten them. There are two types of fastening; one made with "palmilla" fiber (a species of Century Plant or agave and the other with a tree branch called "sawarique". In one of the rooms, the original floor can be seen, made from adobe so well and smooth finished that it looks like cement. Roof and walls of rooms are black, probably by the accumulation of soot and smoke from fires that through hundreds of years were lit there. There is another cave in the opposite side of the canyon, is smaller with only three rooms, but very well preserved.

Half a kilometer above is a small cave with a lonely and small house in very good condition. With a view of the Canyon, this place was likely an observation or surveillance point.

== The cultures ==
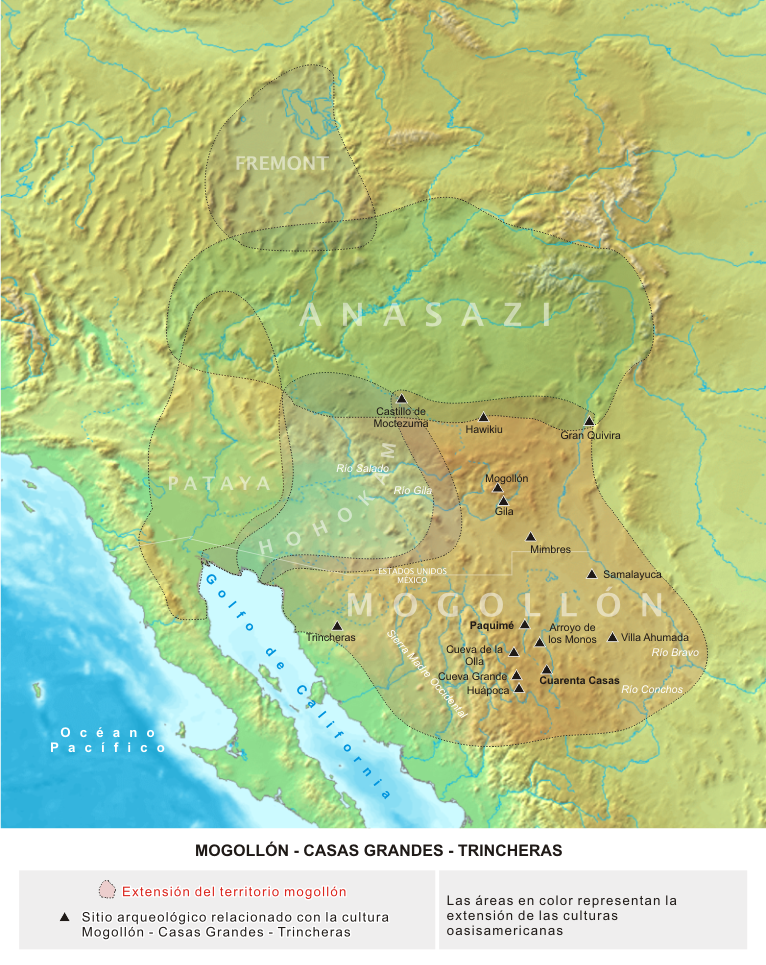
Mogollon and Paquimé Culture Extension

Human groups of hunter-gatherers arrive in the region from the north, probably Mogollon, Anasazi or Hohokam, following the Sierra Madre Occidental; used plants, took advantage of smaller animal species, as turkeys; occupied the mountains and gradually dispersed in rivers, developing the Paquimé culture or "Casas Grandes", whose first settlers were collectors in the process of learning sedentary traits.

Mogollon (/mʌɡɪˈjoʊn/ or /moʊɡəˈjoʊn/) culture evidences have been found, simple ceramic fragments and other more scarce luxury type materials, characteristic of the Paquime culture. The Site constructors probably were villagers who in addition to intensively exploit the environment, as can be seen in the premises vestiges, cultivated corn, squash, and beans, therefore they established a community use system.

Important evidence exists of northern Mexico settlers, of the Casas Grandes culture, sub-region of the Mogollon culture, that along with the Anasazi and the Hohokam comprise the Oasisamerica area. The northern cultural region is known in Mexico as "Gran Chichimeca" and in United States is called American Southwest.

Sites of culture are located in the State of Chihuahua; Paquimé was the head and commercial center of the region. The first settlements in this culture are dated 1000 BCE, since the late archaic); its apogee occurred between 1261 and 1300 CE, and disappeared in 1450 CE.

The difficult nature of this area shaped the distinctive traits of its inhabitants; who developed from nomadic hunter-gatherers to sedentary, farmed the land and animals.

Sites of the culture are found from the Pacific Ocean coast to the Sierra Madre Occidental, passing through a varied ecological and climatic environment.

=== First cultural stage ===
The first stage is called "desert", the ancient natives made petroglyphs and cave paintings for ceremonial hunting events. The most representative is Samalayuca.

=== Second cultural stage ===
The "Mountain Stage", is part of the cliff houses, on top of canyons. Caves and holes became shelters and housing; it was required to be comfortable in extreme temperatures, and serve as protection against attacks. The main development of this culture occurred in Paquimé, a large commercial city with three-story buildings which gave name to the Casas Grandes culture.

In addition to religious testimonies, left important artistic creations, such as their fine ceramic.

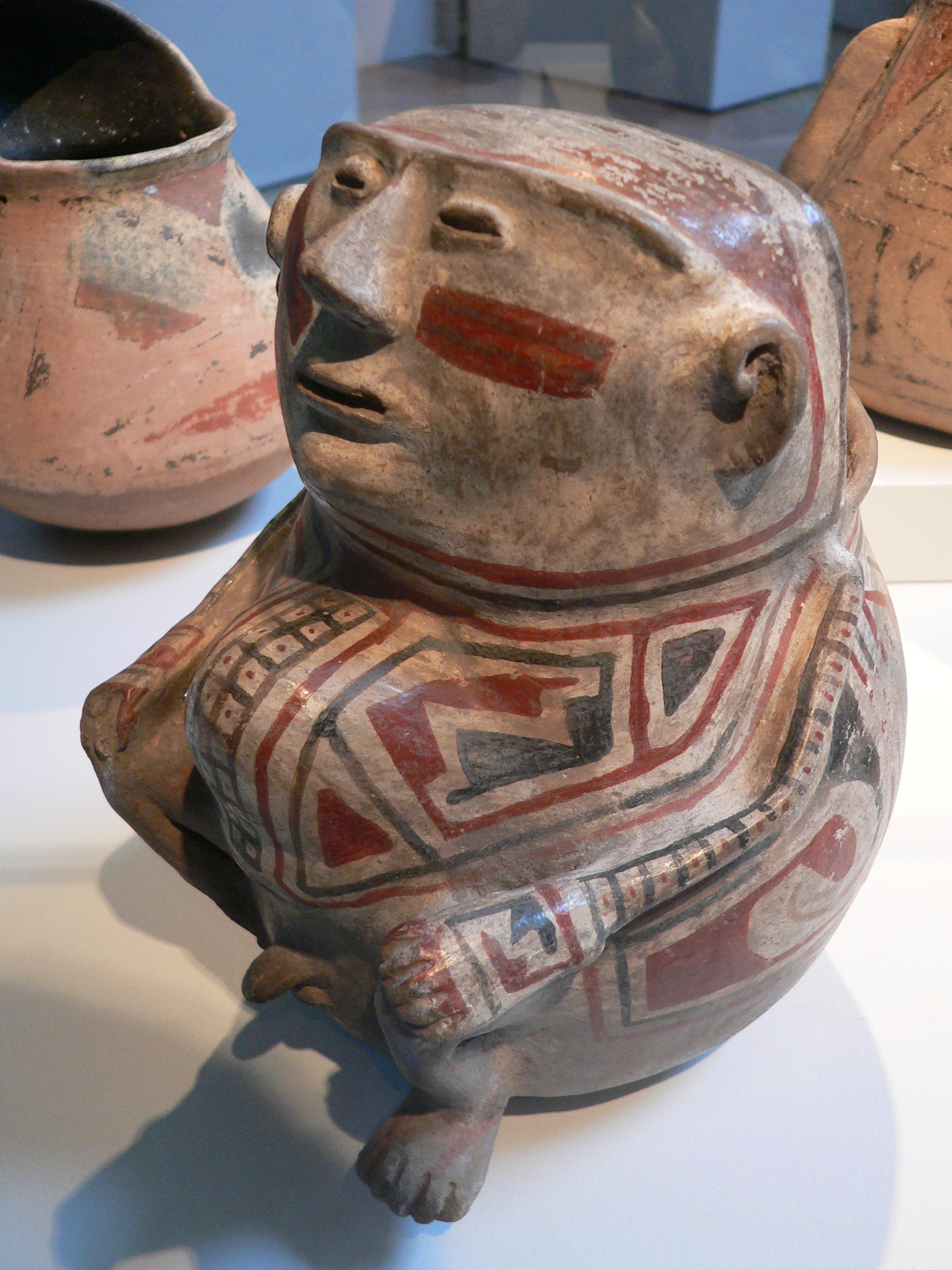
Human-shaped Jar, Casas Grandes Culture. Part of the Stanford Museum collection (United States).

=== The Paquimé culture ===
The Paquimé culture is classified as part of the Mogollon cultures group, and depending on the sources (United States or Mexican) is part of the Southwest or the North; lately these have been reclassified as Oasisamerica.

The culture reached its apogee in the Casas Grandes region, Chihuahua, Mexico, and in the human settlement known as Paquimé. Through this region passed ancient groups, members of human migrations to the south (Mexico and Central America) in different epochs, towards 3000 BCE, are the first indications of yuto-aztec groups, which confined the oldest Hohokam settlers to the east and west of the region.

Around 700 CE, began the Paquimé culture in the region, with the introduction of agriculture and semi-underground small adobe houses construction, built on the banks of "Piedras Verdes", "San Pedro" and "San Miguel" rivers, these rivers join to form the Casas Grandes River.

Archaeologist Charles Di Peso, has studied the area, and proposed six stages for the culture development.

==== Stage I ====
Pre-ceramic horizon. Its beginning is unknown, concluded between 100 and 200 CE.

==== Stage II ====
Undecorated ceramic period. Concluded towards 800 CE.

==== Stage III ====
Old period. Concluded around 1100 CE. During this period the first villages were established and its settlers practiced season agriculture, used runoff water from the mountains.

The period subdivides in:

- Convent Phase.
- Pilón Phase.

During the above phases started the construction of circular homes, built by excavating a circle of less than a meter deep, which served as a base, such housing area were approximately 10 m^{2} and the door round, in the middle of the village stood a community housing larger than the family homes.

- Perros Bravos Phase. During this phase increased the size of houses, began building next to each other and the base ceased to be circular by adapting a square shape. Decorated pottery was present in this period, also appear pieces of shell necklaces, small turquoise beads and copper.

==== Stage IV ====
Medium period. Finished in 1400 CE. The social organization and city appearance was transformed.

The period is subdivided in:

- Buena Fe Phase. Houses are single-story and doors are T-shaped and roofs are beam-supported.
- Paquimé Phase. The culture reaches its greatest splendor, trade relations with other populations increase and ceremonial structures are built. The city is crossed by an irrigation system of channels that provide water, built a ballgame court and began construction of multi-story houses; some constructions had up to four levels.
- Diablo Phase. The city was partially abandoned. Decline began due to attacks from enemy peoples. Towards 1340 CE, the population fell to enemies and many inhabitants were killed: this is concluded from the large amounts of human remains found in grotesque postures.

==== Stage V ====
Late period. From 1340 to 1660 CE. This period is subdivided in:

- Robles Phase.
- First sporadic Spaniards contact Phase.

==== Stage VI ====
Spaniards period. From 1660 to 1821 CE.

=== Constructive characteristics ===
==== T Doors ====
T-shaped doors. In adobe walls; wider on top and narrower below, small height, barely one meter. According to a theory, the door shape is associated to the prehistoric "cachinas" (ancestors spirits), represented in the United States southwest.

==== Walls ====
Construction by a box system. Used molds to pour mud without organic material, compacted. The exterior was stuccoed with sand, lime and oyster dust shells, then it was painted blue, green and pink. Without foundation; the walls were built from slots 25 cm deep. For several levels, the walls below were wider, up to 1.40 m, and 50 cm at higher levels.

==== Furnaces and ventilation ====
Used to control interior temperature. Ventilation was made in the doors, for smoke outflow, these were proportional to the size of the room used.

==== Stairs and ramps ====
Constructed in buildings.

==== Water system ====
"Water retention systems". An irrigation system of channels, on terraces and embankments, took water from rivers, taking it into the city. The rectangular stone slabs channels 30 cm, were used to feed rooms; had a deposit that filtered used water in temazcales or steam baths. There was also a drain system.

== The site ==
Cueva La Ranchería is larger than the "Cuarenta Casas" complex. It is 50 meters long and 20 m wide. Most of the rooms are two-story and large. There are also granaries (Cuexcomate, see note below), somewhat damaged, made from adobe and straw, for maize storage.

The site is located at the back of the canyon in a large semi hidden cave. It is ample and easily holds a complex of 50 rooms or more.

=== Rooms ===
The rooms are bigger than in other caves in the region, and many are two storied. Here lived a whole town. The foundation of this complex is a well-built stone trench; many of the rooms have walls and ceiling black by soot, although there are kind of chimneys. In one of the rooms the construction techniques for the first level ceiling can be appreciated, they used táscate and pine tree trunks, tied together and covered with clay. This holds the second floor and is supported by a pretty thick trunk, all blackened by soot. The room on the second floor is spacious and has a little room, as if used for children.

=== Paintings ===
In the walls of a section of the complex are a series of paquimé type paintings, with very simple geometric black motifs. The complex has a circular-shaped partially destroyed silo. These silos stored corn, olotes dating back to ancient times can still be seen. Silos were made with pine straw and adobe, and circular shape. There is metate in perfect condition, many fragments of ceramics and lytic tools.

=== Other nearby caves ===
There is another site nearby called Cueva de la Ranchería 2, where braided corn stems were used, for adobe wall construction.

The Pirinolas cave has an internal complex, which seems embedded in the cave.

There are two other caves, that also had internal houses.

=== Cuexcomate ===
This type of barns, similar to others in the highlands, for example Cacaxtla in Tlaxcala, cuexcomates is evidence of structures used for storage of agricultural products, as well as for food and human subsistence.

Archaeological evidence exist about peoples who had agriculture and soils and water retention systems.

== See also ==
- Mogollon
- Oasisamerica
- Ciudad Madera
- Chihuahua (state)
