= Xochitecatl =

Pre-Columbian archaeological site in Tlaxcala, Mexico

Coordinates: 19.24483°N 98.34939°W

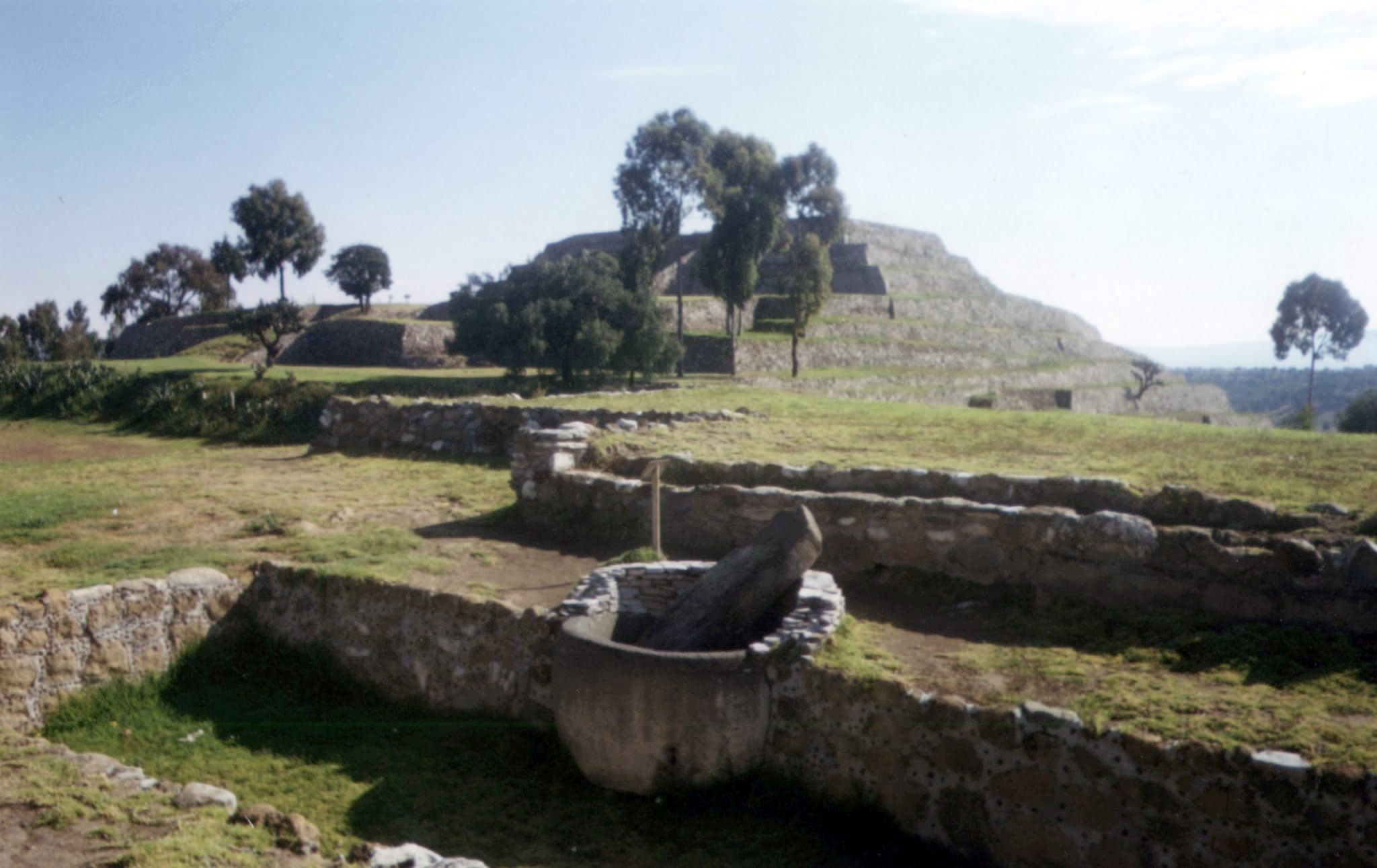
The Pyramid of Flowers behind a monolithic basin on the Serpent Building at Xochitecatl

Xochitecatl [ʃot͡ʃiˈtekat͡ɬ] is a pre-Columbian archaeological site located in the Mexican State of Tlaxcala, 18 km southwest of Tlaxcala city. The major architecture dates to the Middle Preclassic Period (1000–400 BC) but occupation continued, with one major interruption, until the Late Classic, when the site was abandoned. There is some evidence of ritual activity in the Postclassic and Colonial Periods. The ruins cover an area of 12 hectares on top of a volcanic dome.

Xochitecatl, unlike other contemporary sites, appears to have been a purely ceremonial centre for a population dispersed through the surrounding countryside rather than the centre of an urban area.

== Etymology ==
Xochitecatl is formed from two Nahuatl words, xōchitl [ˈʃoːt͡ʃit͡ɬ] (flower) and tecatl [ˈtekat͡ɬ] (person), hence the person of flowers or the lineage of flowers.

== Location ==
Xochitecatl is located in a dominant position upon the summit of a 4 km-wide extinct volcano that forms a range of hills that rises approximately 200 meters above the floor of the Puebla-Tlaxcala Valley; the so-called Atlachino-Nativitas-Xochitecatl block, which is located in the centre of the valley. Xochitecatl has clear views across the surrounding valleys to the neighbouring volcanoes of Popocatepetl, Iztaccihuatl and La Malinche. The rivers Atoyac and Zahuapan flow close to the site. The site is the focal point of an area distinguished by its high agricultural productivity, sometimes named "the Mesoamerican Mesopotamia", because of its fertile lands between the rivers Atoyac and Zayapan.

Xochitecatl lies 1 km west of, and within sight of, the contemporary Classic Period site of Cacaxtla, distinguished by its famous painted murals in Maya style. Xochitecatl is located 500m north of the modern town of Xochitecatitla and the same distance to the southeast of Atoyatenco.

== History ==
=== Preclassic Period ===
Around 800 BC, during the Middle Preclassic Period, the construction of Xochitecatl was begun with the construction of the Pyramid of Flowers, the Spiral Building and the Serpent Building. In the period from 550 BC to 400 BC, further structures were added to these existing buildings. By the period spanning 350 BC to 100 AD, Xochitecatl had become the centre of a powerful chiefdom exercising control over a large portion of western Tlaxcala. From 200 BC to 150 BC the Pyramid of Flowers was greatly expanded and further modifications took place at the Serpent Building. The site was abandoned in approximately 150 AD, after an eruption of Popocatepetl volcano.

=== Epiclassic (or Late Classic) Period ===
Between 600 AD and 950 AD Xochitecatl was reoccupied when parts of the site were reused as a secondary ceremonial centre within the extended urban area of Cacaxtla. The Platform of the Volcanoes was built and the Pyramid of Flowers became the centre of ritual activity including the sacrifice of children. About 950 AD both Xochitecatl and Cacaxtla were abandoned, although there is evidence of continued ritual activity in the Postclassic Period.

=== Modern history ===
Major excavations were undertaken at the site in 1993-4 by Mari Carmen Serra Puche with the goal of exploring the principal structures around the site core. In the course of these investigations two obsidian workshops were uncovered; in the Pyramid of Flowers (Building E1) and the Serpent Building (Building E2).

== Site description ==
The ceremonial centre of Xochitecatl lies around two plazas surrounded by the principle structures. Around the main plaza are located the Pyramid of Flowers, the Serpent Building and the Platform of the Volcanoes. The western plaza is bordered by the Spiral Building.

=== The Pyramid of Flowers ===
(Pirámide de las Flores in Spanish, designated as Building E1)

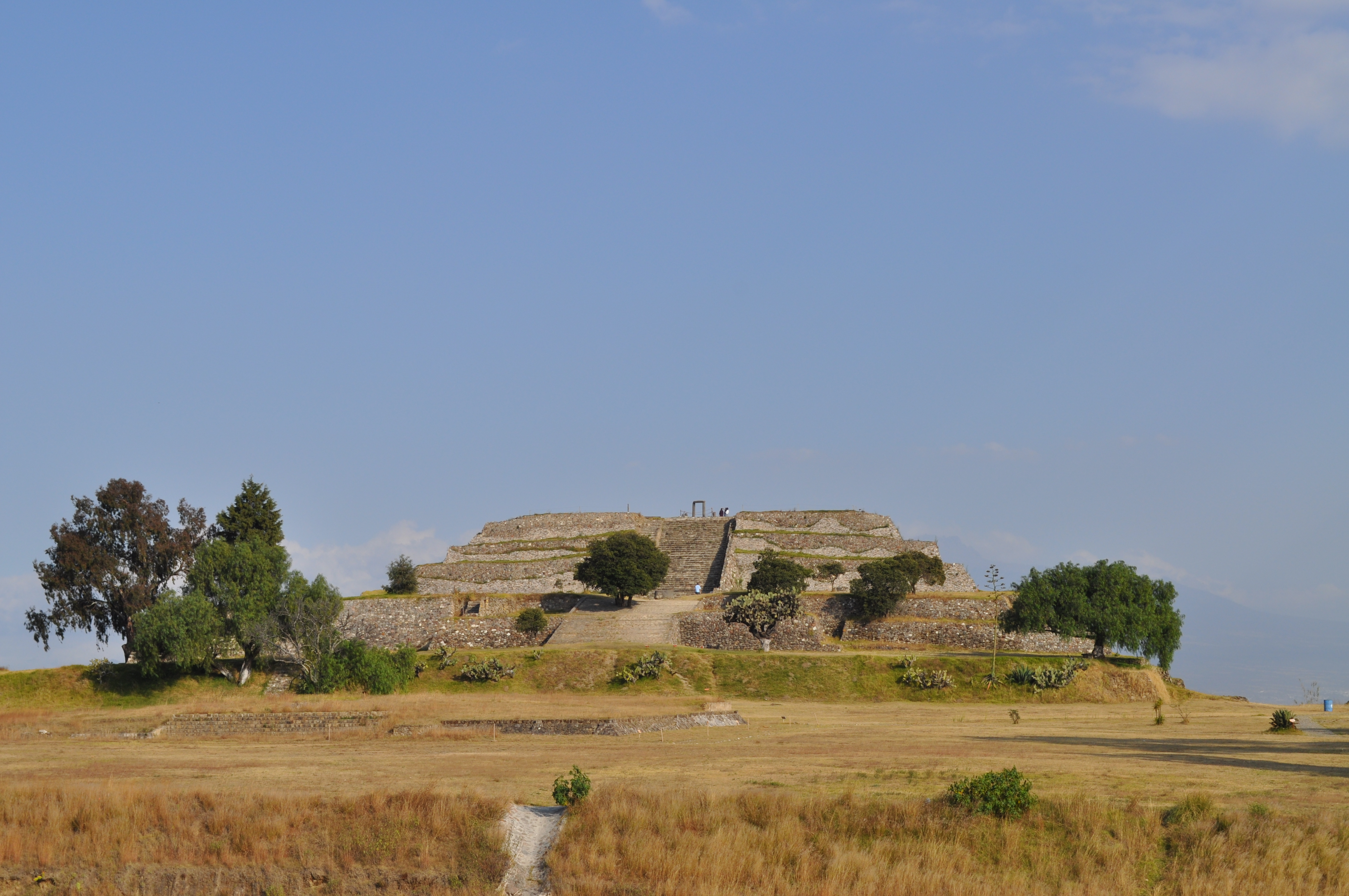
Xochitécatl Pirámide de las Flores

This structure was built during the Preclassic Period but shows evidence of use right up to the Spanish Colonial Period. The base of the pyramid measures 100 meters by 140 meters, a similar size to that of the Pyramid of the Moon in Teotihuacan. Inside were found the burials of more than 30 children and one adult accompanied by offerings. Beads of green stone were deposited in the mouths of some of the children in order to accompany them on their journey to the underworld.

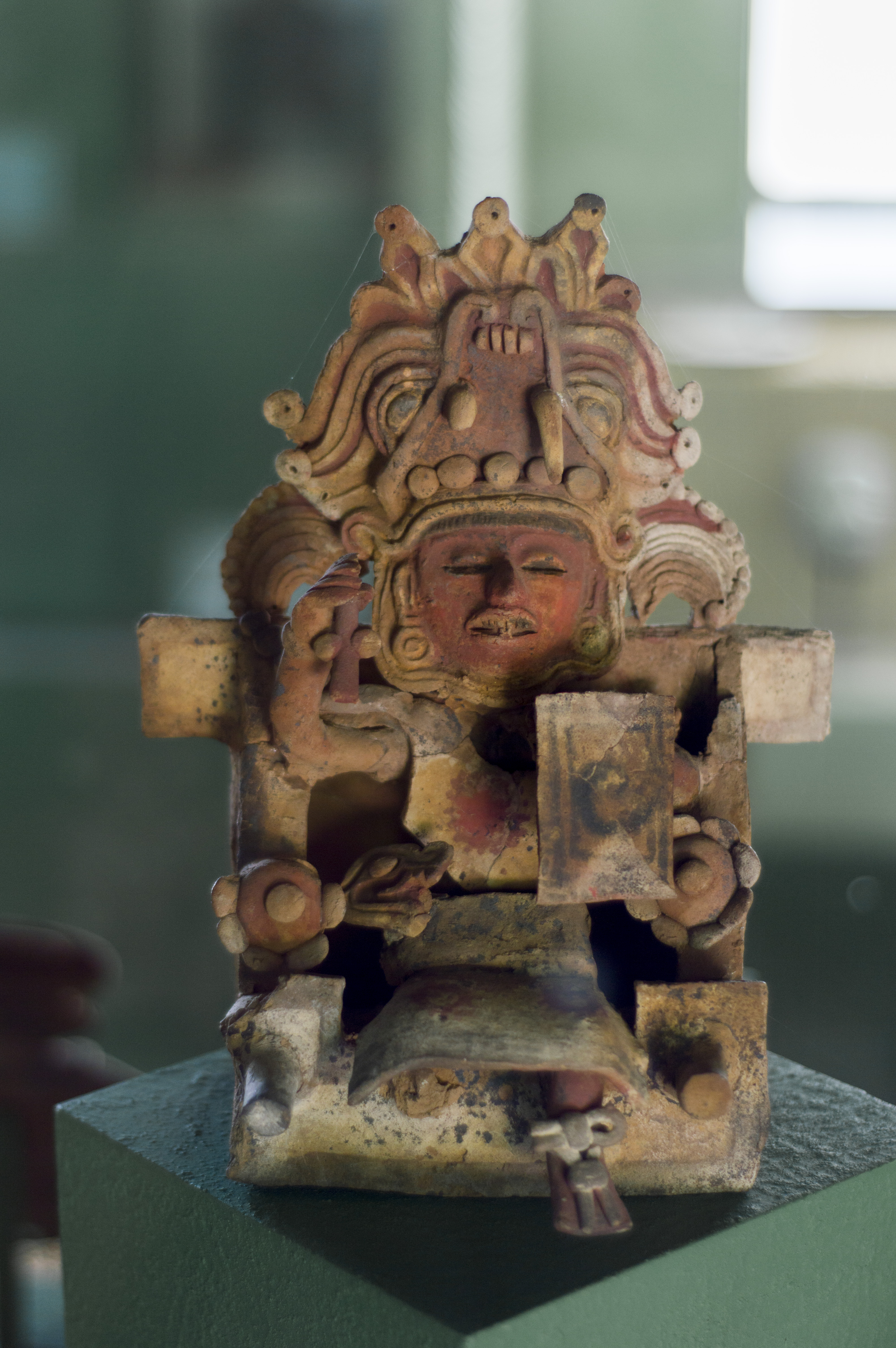
Xochitécatl clay figurine

Upon the stairway giving access to the upper part of the building were deposited offerings that included more than 2000 clay figurines and 15 stone sculptures representing both humans and animals. The distinguishing feature of the figurines is the great quantity of figures that represent females from infancy right through to old age, including babies, richly-dressed women and pregnant women. Some figurines represent women with an opening in the abdomen containing richly dressed babies. Others show mothers carrying their children in their arms or upon their backs. The figurines are richly detailed, giving a glimpse of the daily attire in pre-Columbian times. Some of the women represented are wearing pleated skirts or skirts decorated with geometric designs such as lines, stripes, circles and dots; some figurines wear blouses (quezquemetl) which are similarly decorated. Some of the women wear coloured bows in their hair while others are adorned with four- or five-petalled flowers.

A stairway ascends the pyramid, before it stand two large monolithic basins, one measuring 1.7 meters in diameter. Four sculptures were found deposited in the larger basin; a sculpture of a toad, a sculpture of a mythological serpent disgorging a human face from its open jaws and two sculptures of human faces.

During excavations on the Pyramid of Flowers, more than two hundred grey, black and green obsidian projectile points were recovered, together with hundreds of fragments of the same stone. More than twenty stone sculptures were also recovered, the majority of which were mutilated; these include animal sculptures such as a canine, an amphibian and a monkey; there are also anthropomorphic and mythological sculptures, such as a sculpture that represents a fleshless human face with the body of a rattlesnake and has been linked by investigators with local folklore of the goddess Xochitl, who takes the form of a beautiful woman but who can transform into a snake.

Each year on 29 September the sun rises directly from the mouth of the La Malinche volcano, as seen from the summit of the Pyramid of Flowers. This date coincides with the annual festival at nearby San Miguel el Milagro, just under 2 km away to the east.

=== The Serpent Building ===
(Edificio de la Serpiente in Spanish, designated as Building E2)

This building dates from around 700 BC (in the Preclassic Period) and measures 80 meters by 50 meters. A monolithic stone basin measuring 1.3 meters across and 60 cm high is found on top of the structure. A mutilated stela was deposited inside, bearing the carving of a snake's fangs and forked tongue. To the north of this were found two stone sculptures; one of a man dressed as a jaguar and the other of a man with pronounced forehead and lips holding a sceptre or staff in his right hand. A room was built at ground level against the west side of the Serpent Building. Large amounts of worked obsidian were found in the northeast corner of this building, indicating that it was probably used as a workshop. Items found include cores, stone chippings, knives, projectile points and scrapers as well as bone tools and antlers. Associated ceramic remains were used to date these finds to the Late Preclassic (350 BC – 100 AD).

Originally the Serpent Building was a square structure with the only means of access being a stairway on the north side. Later the building was expanded to the east with the addition of another platform. At the same time the north stairway was blocked off and a new stairway was built using tepetate covered with mud.

=== The Spiral Building ===
(Edificio de la Espiral in Spanish, designated as Building E3)

This circular stepped pyramid lies on the western side of the ceremonial centre and was built around 700 BC, in the Preclassic Period. Due to its location on the hillside the western side of the pyramid has more levels than the eastern side. No trace of internal structures was found during excavation, the interior of the structure consisting of volcanic ash. The building has no stairway giving access to the top, it was climbed by following the spiral form of the building itself. A Christian cross was placed on top of the structure in 1632 AD, about 90 years after the Spanish Conquest, and remains in place to this day. Two burials were found in the structure, which was probably a temple to Ehecatl, the god of wind.

=== The Platform of the Volcanoes ===
(Basamento de los Volcanes in Spanish, designated as Building E4)

This structure lies in the middle of the central plaza and is oriented north–south. The building measures 50 meters along its north–south axis and is 35 meters wide. Construction began in the Middle Preclassic, the building was then reused during the Classic Period, thus producing two phases of architecture. More than two hundred figurines representing the female form were recovered from this structure during the 1960s by German archaeologist Bodo Spranz. Of particular interest was a figurine representing a flayed female and identified as the goddess Tlazolteotl.

The earliest phase of construction, including the east and west stairways, is built from tepetate overlaid with mud. The second phase reused the earlier stone walls, which were then covered with stucco. As at Teotihuacan, this building deviates 16 degrees from magnetic north, this is particularly evident with the earlier construction phase. A looted offering consistent with the interment of the remains of human infants was found in the upper part of this platform.

Xochitecatl is in the care of the Instituto Nacional de Antropología e Historia (National Institute of Anthropology and History) and is open to the public.

== See also ==
- Cacaxtla
- List of Mesoamerican pyramids
