= Tecollotzin =

Tecollotzin was a Tlatoque (ruler) of Coyoacán altepetl in 15th century Mexico.

== Family ==
He was a son of the Maxtla, the ruler of Coyoacán, and grandson of ruler Tezozomoc and Tzihuacxochitzin I.

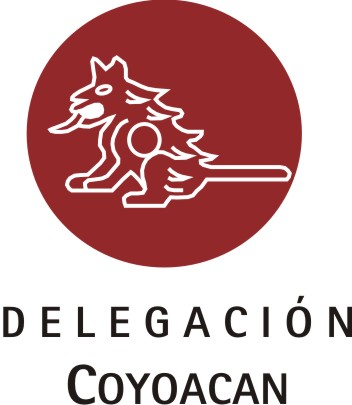
Glyph for Coyoacán, city of Tecollotzin

His aunt was Ayauhcihuatl (Aztec "empress") and his uncle was Quaquapitzahuac.

Upon Tezozomoc's death in the year Twelve Rabbit (1426), his son Tayatzin became a king, but Maxtla seized power at Azcapotzalco, leaving the rulership of Coyoacán to Tecollotzin.

=== Family pole ===
King Xolotl
Acolnahuacatl
Tezozomoc
Maxtla
Tecollotzin
