= Matlacohuatl =

Matlacohuatl was a tlatoani (king) of pre-Hispanic altepetl (city-state) Azcapotzalco (altepetl).

He is also known as Maxtlacozcatl.

His wife was Queen Cuitlachtepetl and he ruled 1152 to 1222.

He was likely a father of his successor Chiconquiauhtzin and ancestor of famous king Tezozomoc.
