= Tlacateotl =

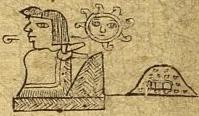
- Tlacateotl in the Codex Xolotl, with his name glyph (top) and the glyph for Tlatelolco (right).

Tlatoani of Tlatelolco
- Reign: 1417 - 1426 (or 1427/8)
- Died: 1426 or 1427/8
- Spouse: Queen Xiuhtomiyauhtzin; Queen Xiuhcanahualtzin
- Issue: Tezozomoctli; Itzquauhtzin
- Father: King Quaquapitzahuac
- Mother: Queen Acxocueitl

Tlacateotl (or Tlacateotzin; ? – 1426 or 1427/28) was the second Tlatoani of the Aztec city of Tlatelolco from 1417 until his death.

== Reign ==
Under his rule the Tlatelolcas continued to expand their wealth and influence within the valley of Mexico. Through trade and tribute, the city's market grew to include trade in wool, jade and quetzal feathers. Tlacateotl also ordered the removal of sculptures from the ruins of Tula to decorate the growing city.

His reign ended in 1426 or 1427/8 during the succession struggle in Azcapotzalco between Tayatzin and Maxtla. He is recorded as having been stoned to death while traveling by canoe. Maxtla is commonly assumed to have ordered the murder, possibly due to a suspected affair between Tlacateotl and Maxtla's wife. He was succeeded by his grandson, Quauhtlatoa.

== Family ==
He succeeded his father, Quaquapitzahuac, upon his death in 1417. He was a brother of the queens Matlalatzin and Huacaltzintli and grandson of the famous king Tezozomoc. He was also a cousin of Emperor Chimalpopoca and uncle of the prince Tezozomoc.

He was a father of the kings Tezozomoctli and Itzquauhtzin and grandfather of Quauhtlatoa. His wives were called Xiuhtomiyauhtzin and Xiuhcanahualtzin, both of which were his aunts (one on each side).

== Sources ==
- Chimalpahin Cuauhtlehuanitzin, Domingo Francisco de San Antón Muñón (1997). Codex Chimalpahin: society and politics in Mexico Tenochtitlan, Tlatelolco, Texcoco, Culhuacan, and other Nahua altepetl in central Mexico: the Nahuatl and Spanish annals and accounts collected and recorded by don Domingo de San Antón Muñón Chimalpahin Quauhtlehuanitzin. The Civilization of the American Indian Series. edited and translated by Arthur J. O. Anderson and Susan Schroeder. Norman: University of Oklahoma Press. ISBN 0-8061-2921-2.

Preceded by Quaquapitzahuac	King of Tlatelolco; 1417–1426 or 1427/8	Succeeded by Quauhtlatoa
