= Acxocueitl =

- Queen of Tlatelolco
- Spouse: Quaquapitzahuac
- Issue: Tlacateotl; Matlalatzin; Huacaltzintli
- Father: Acolmiztli
- Mother: Tlazozomizqui

Acxocueitl was the first Queen consort of city-state of Tlatelolco.

She was a daughter of Acolmiztli and the princess, Tlazozomizqui. She married Quaquapitzahuac.

Their children were:

- Tlacateotl
- Matlalatzin
- Huacaltzintli

She was a grandmother of the prince Tezozomoc and sister of Xiuhtomiyauhtzin.
