= Xiuhtomiyauhtzin =

- Queen of Tlatelolco
- Spouse: Tlacateotl
- Issue: King Tezozomoctli; Queen Izquixotzin
- Father: Acolmiztli

Xiuhtomiyauhtzin was a Queen consort of Tlatelolco.

== Family ==
She was born as a princess, the daughter of the king Acolmiztli.

She married the king Tlacateotl. She was a mother of the king Tezozomoctli and Queen Izquixotzin and sister of queen Acxocueitl.
