= Tezozomoc (Azcapotzalco) =

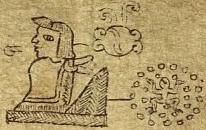
- Tezozomoc in the Codex Xolotl, with his name glyph (top) and the glyph for Azcapotzalco (right)

Tlatoani of Azcapotzalco
- Reign: 1367 or 1370–1426
- Predecessor: Acolnahuacatzin
- Successor: Tayatzin
- Born: c. 1320
- Died: 1426 (aged 105-106)
- Spouse: Chalchiuhcozcatzin; Tzihuacxochitzin I
- Issue more...: Aculnahuacatl Tzaqualcatl; Maxtla; Xiuhcanahualtzin; Quaquapitzahuac; Ayauhcihuatl; Tayatzin
- Father: Acolnahuacatzin

Tezozomoc Yacateteltetl (also Tezozómoc, Tezozomoctli, Tezozomoctzin; c. 1320 – 1426), was a Tepanec leader who ruled the altepetl (ethnic state) of Azcapotzalco from the year 1353 or Five Reed (1367) or Eight Rabbit (1370) until his death in the year Twelve Rabbit (1426). Histories written down in the early colonial period portray Tezozomoc as a military and political genius who oversaw an expansion of Tepanec influence, bringing about Azcapotzalco's dominance in the Valley of Mexico and beyond.

== Biography ==
Tezozomoc was a son of Acolnahuacatzin and Cuetlaxochitzin. He is described by Fernando de Alva Cortés Ixtlilxochitl as a tyrant and: "the most cruel man who ever lived, proud, warlike and domineering. And he was so old, according to what appears in the histories, and to what elderly princes have told me, that they carried him about like a child swathed in feathers and soft skins; they always took him out into the sun to warm him up, and at night he slept between two great braziers, and he never withdrew from their glow because he lacked natural heat. And he was very temperate in his eating and drinking and for this reason he lived so long."

He approved the choice of King Huitzilihuitl in 1403 and gave him his daughter Ayauhcihuatl in marriage, notwithstanding the opposition of his son Maxtla. He declared war against the king of Texcoco, Techotlalatzin, and being defeated sued for peace; but after the latter's death he continued the war against his successor, Ixtlilxochitl I, whom he defeated and assassinated in 1419, usurping the crown of Texcoco.

Upon Tezozomoc's death in the year Twelve Rabbit (1426), his son Tayatzin became a king, but Maxtla seized power at Azcapotzalco, leaving the rulership of Coyoacán to his son Tecollotzin.

Tezozomoc was a grandfather of Tlacateotl, Matlalatzin, Huacaltzintli and Chimalpopoca and great-grandfather of Tezozomoc of Ecatepec.

== Issue ==
His wives were Chalchiuhcozcatzin and Tzihuacxochitzin I.

According to the Crónica mexicáyotl, Tezozomoc had several sons, all of whom he made rulers. With Chalchiuhcozcatzin, he had:

- Tayatzin, who initially ruled after Tezozomoc's death but was later usurped by Maxtla.

With Tzihuacxochitzin I, he had:

- Epcoatzin
- Icel Azcatl
- Itzpapalocihuatl
- Aculnahuacatl Tzaqualcatl, who was installed as ruler of Tlacopan.
- Tlacochcuecihuatl
- Chichilocuili
- Maxtla, who was installed as ruler of Coyoacán.
- Xaltemoctzin
- Xiuhcanahualtzin
- Quaquapitzahuac, who was installed as ruler of Tlatelolco.

With other women, he had:

- Epcoatl, who was installed as ruler of Atlacuihuayan.
- Tzihuactlayahuallohuatzin, who was installed as ruler of Tiliuhcan.
- Ayauhcihuatl, married to Huitzilihuitl and had Chimalpopoca.

== See also ==
- List of Tenochtitlan rulers

== Notes ==
Preceded by Acolnahuacatzin	Tlatoani of Azcapotzalco; 1371–1426	Succeeded by Tayatzin
