= Chiconquiauhtzin =

Chiconquiauhtzin (or Chiconquiauitl) was a tlatoani (king) of Tepanec altepetl (city-state) Azcapotzalco.

He was likely a son of the king Matlacohuatl and queen Cuitlachtepetl.

He ruled from 1222 to 1248 and married princess Xicomoyahual. Their son was possibly his successor, Tezcapoctli.
