= Cacaxtla =

Archeological zone in Tlaxcala, Mexico

Coordinates: 19.24313°N 98.34000°W

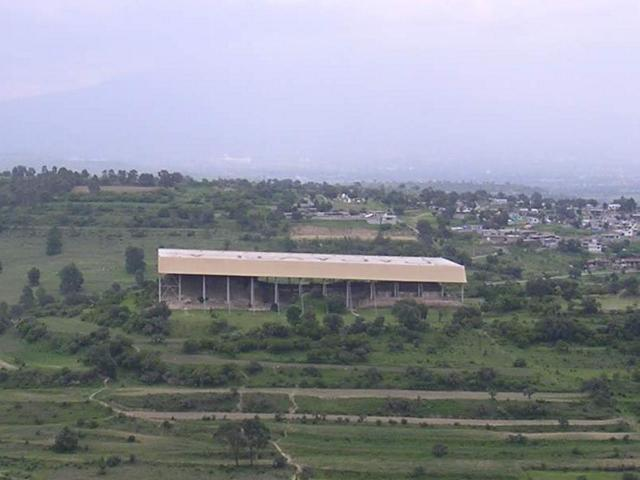
The Gran Basamento, protected by its sheet-metal roof

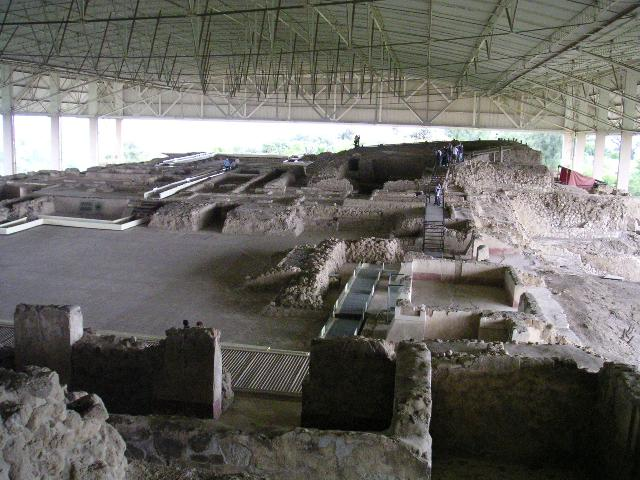
View over the top of the Gran Basamento

Cacaxtla (Nahuatl pronunciation: [kaˈkaʃtɬaːn]) is an archaeological site located near the southern border of the Mexican state of Tlaxcala. It contains a sprawling palace with vibrantly colored murals painted in Maya style. The nearby site of Xochitecatl was a more public ceremonial complex associated with Cacaxtla. Cacaxtla and Xochitecatl prospered 650–900 CE, probably controlling important trade routes through the region with an enclave population of no more than 10,000 people.

== History ==
Cacaxtla was the capital of a region inhabited by the Olmeca-Xicallanca people. The origins of the Olmeca-Xicalanca are not known with certainty, but they are assumed to come from the Gulf coast region, and were perhaps Maya settlers who arrived in this part of central Mexico around 400 CE.

The term "Olmeca-Xicalanca" was first mentioned by Tlaxcalan historian Diego Muñoz Camargo at the end of the 16th century. This historian described Cacaxtla as the principal settlement of the "Olmeca", although what we today refer to as the Olmec culture ended ~400 BCE, that is, almost 800 years earlier.

After the fall of the nearby city Cholula (c. 650 – 750) — in which the Cacaxtlecas might have been involved — Cacaxtla became the hegemonic power in this part of the Tlaxcala–Puebla valley. Warriors from Cacaxtla appear to have taken over Cholula for a time, but they were ultimately expelled by the Toltecs. Its ascendancy came to an end around 900 CE and, by 1000, the city had been abandoned.

=== Modern history of the site ===
The site was rediscovered in September 1975 by maintenance workers, but quickly came to the attention of archaeologists. Archaeologists Eduardo Merlo Juárez, Diana Lopez-Sotomayor and Daniel Molina-Feal dedicated over six years of their life excavating the site. The first work to be done in the area consisted on clearing the original tunnel opened by the maintenance workers, Archeologist Diana Lopez-Sotomayor, later appointed project manager, recalled her first view of the life-sized characters depicted in the murals as an overwhelming experience. As further figures appeared on the mural, the area of excavation had to be enlarged and several constructive stages were discovered. The first area to be excavated was the main mural, known as the "Gran Basamento", and the immediate purpose of the work was to protect and secure the murals and other structures from the weather and looters.

== The Site ==
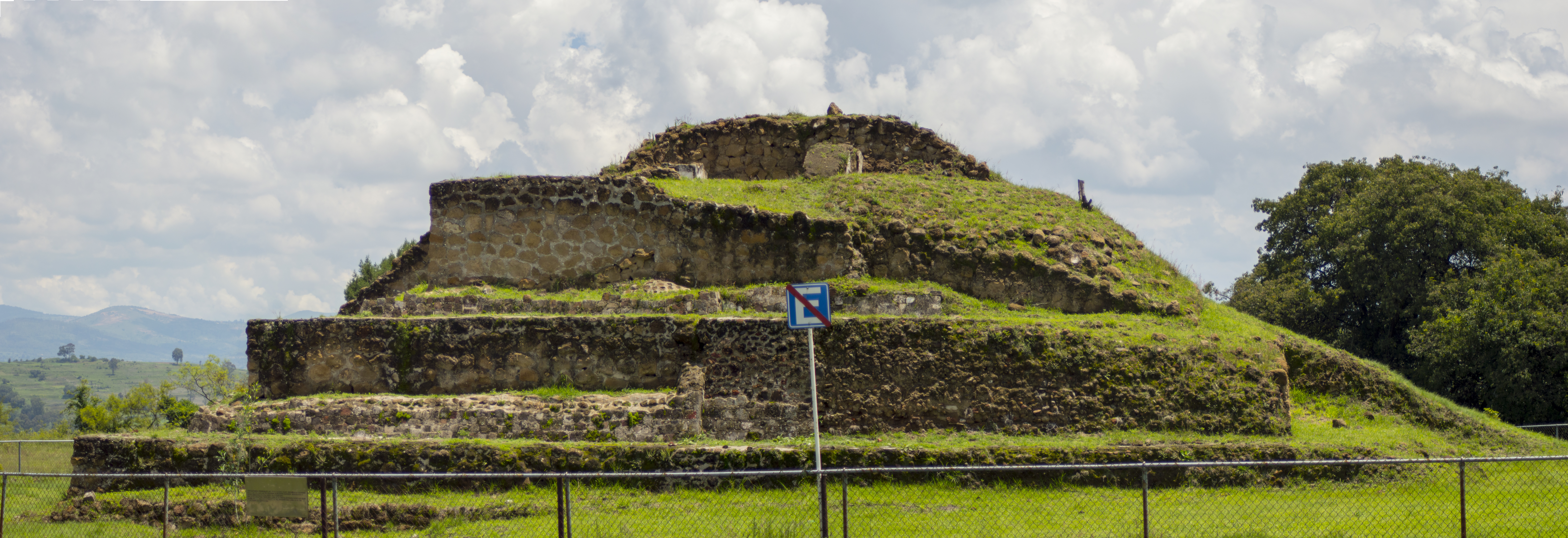
Cacaxtla pyramid mound no. 1

The centre of the city of Cacaxtla was the 200-metre-long, 25-metre-high Gran Basamento – a natural platform offering a fine defensive position and commanding views over the surrounding terrain. The city's main religious and civil buildings were located on this platform, as were the residences of the priest class. Several other smaller pyramids and temple bases stand in the vicinity of the main platform.

Because Cacaxtla's main basamento was not excavated until the 1980s, many of the original coloured wall decorations have been preserved and can be appreciated in situ by visitors to the site. Of particular interest is the fact that most of the murals seem to combine the symbology of Mexican altiplano cultures with influences from the Maya, making Cacaxtla unique in this regard.

== Battle Mural (Mural de la Batalla) ==
The most famous of Cacaxtla's preserved paintings is the "Battle Mural", or Mural de la batalla, located in the northern plaza of the basamento. Dating from prior to 700, it is placed on the sloping limestone wall of a temple base and is split in two by a central staircase. It presents a narrative scene nearly 26 meters (80 feet) long about the fearful armed fight between two clearly differentiated ethnic groups. The winning group has grayish-brown skin, a big nose, and no cranial deformation; they are armed with round shields, obsidian knives, dart launchers (atlatls), and spears. The defeated, by their facial profiles and the deformation of their heads, have been identified as Maya. They appear naked and wear only plumes, pectoral vests, earplugs, and some jade jewels. In A Building, two scenes are special; both are painted on a red background. The southern wall clearly presents a Maya dressed in a bird outfit and helmet, riding on a plumed serpent. The northern wall shows a man dressed in a jaguar outfit and helmet, standing on a jaguar-skinned serpent. This character has a bundle of darts dripping water from one end. The building's jambs are also of interest. On a blue background, two characters appear: a jaguar-man who pours water into a Tlaloc pot and a Maya with a snail, from which emerges a little red-haired man—probably representing the sun.

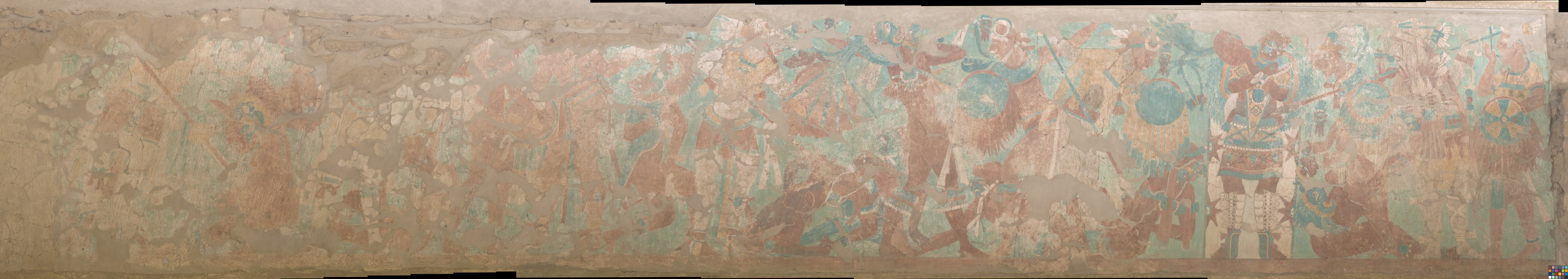
Cacaxtla Battle Mural (left)

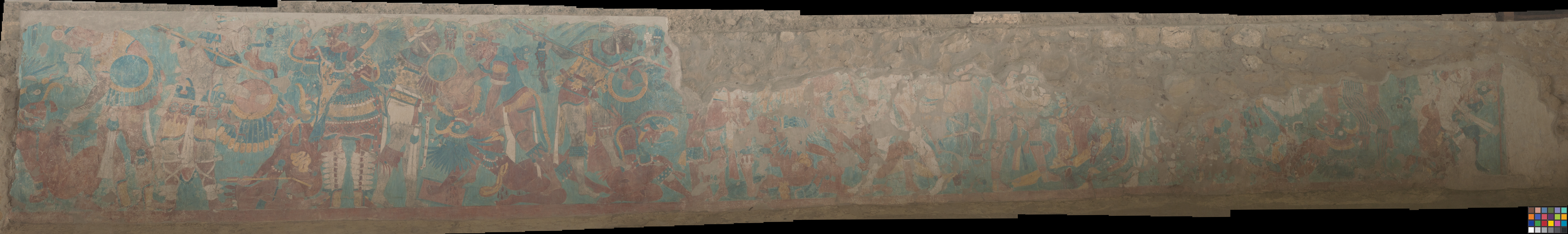
Cacaxtla Battle Mural (right)

== Priestly Attire (Vestidos de Sacerdotes) ==
Cacaxtla conserves the oldest mural painting featuring a human figure and symbols from other cultures (Teotihuacan, Maya, Mixtec and Totonac). These paintings portray the bird man and the feline man, possibly ruler - priests of the Olmecs Xicalancas who inhabited Cacaxtla between the years 600 and 900 AD. The bird man is associated with Quetzalcoatl, the generous deity who taught people the arts and agriculture. The feline man is associated with the rains that fertilize the earth.

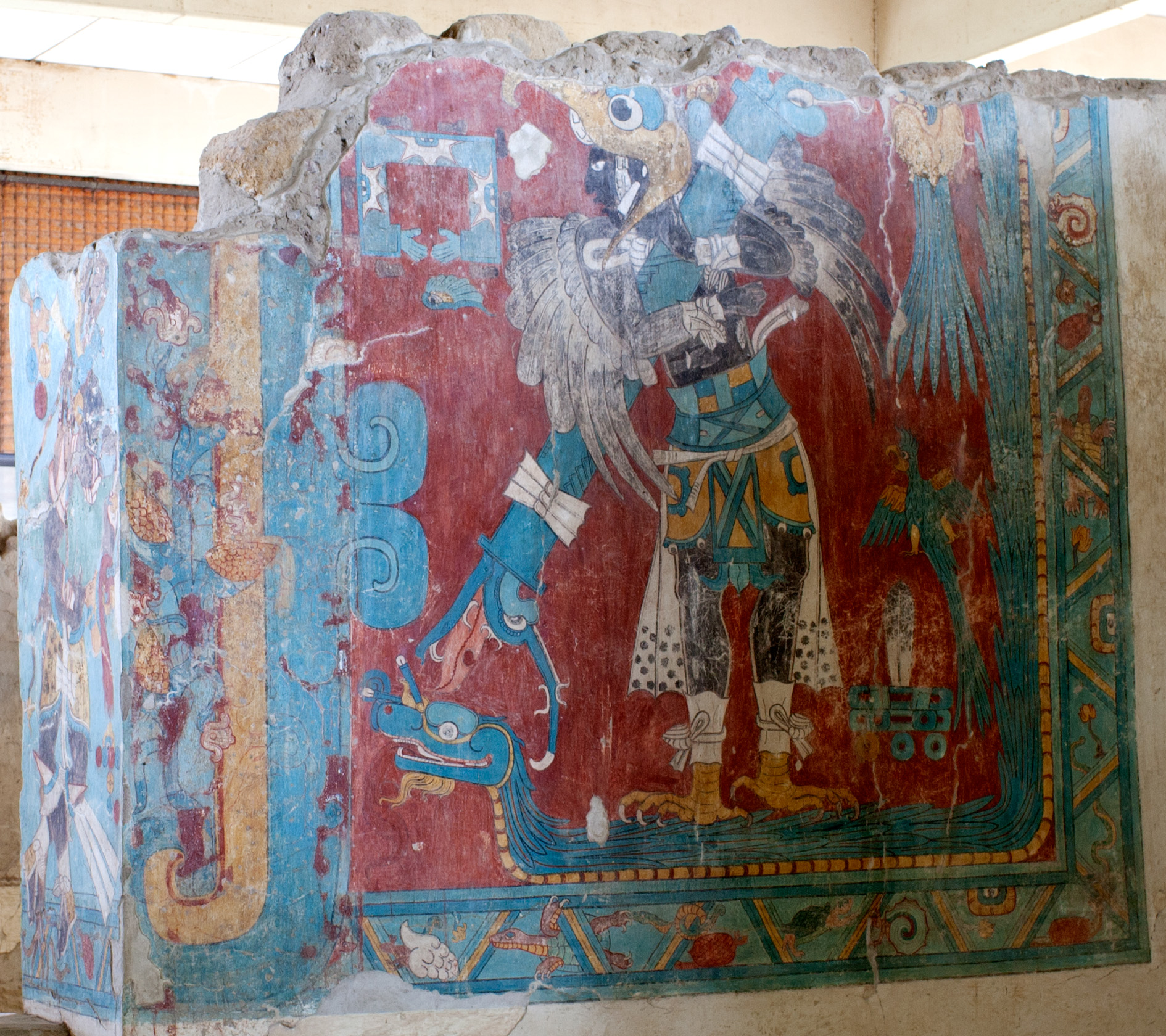
Bird Man (Hombre - ave)

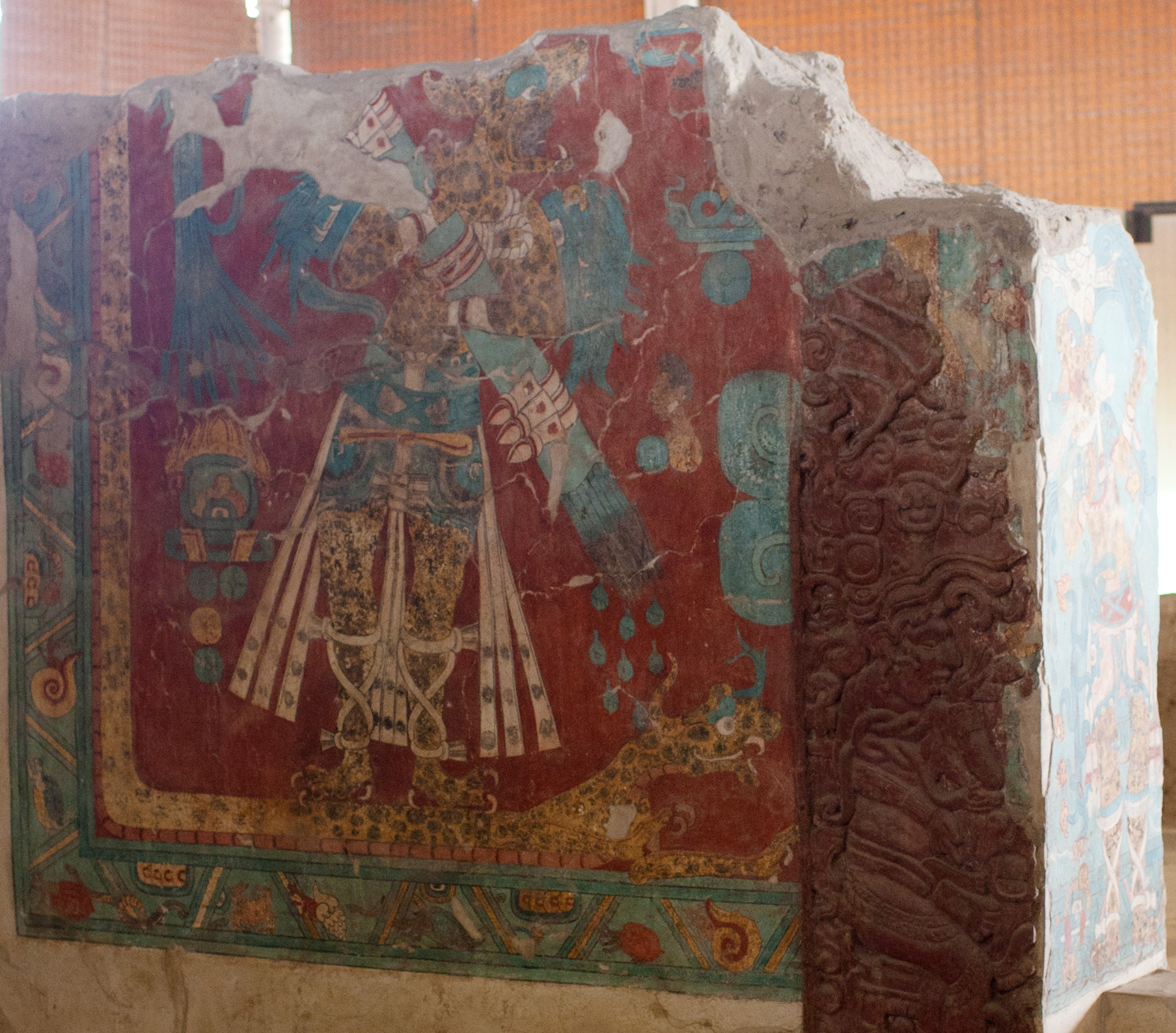
Feline Man (Hombre - felino)

== Venus Temple (Templo de Venus) ==
The Venus Temple that is also located underneath the roof contains two murals on two columns of two figures. On the right column, there is a male figure with a mask covering his face. He wears a skirt with the Venus symbol on the front and has a scorpion tail. On the left, a fragment of the other figure is visible, probably representing a woman with a skirt also bearing a Venus symbol. The presence of Venus on the garments of the figures and their representation around both of them indicate that the murals allude to some astronomical phenomenon or calendrical data associated with the planet Venus, which at that time was related to warfare and sacrifice.

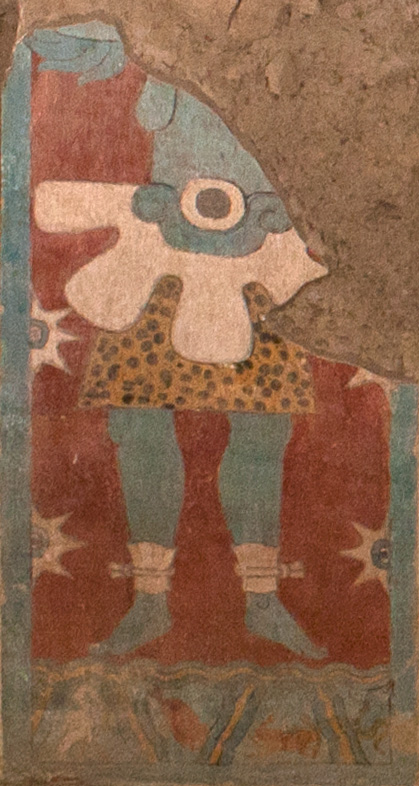
Left column

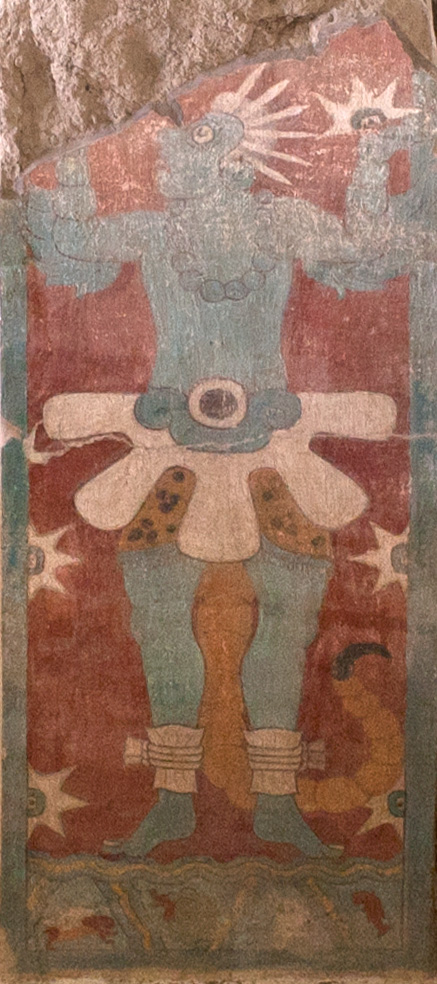
Right column

== Mural del Templo Rojo ==
The Mural del Templo Rojo is located at the Governors' Room (Las Habitactiones de los Gobernantes). It is located in the staircase leading to the room, and only one side is visible to the public. The other side of the staircase is not facing a public walkway, but is displayed as a reproduction in the corresponding museum building.

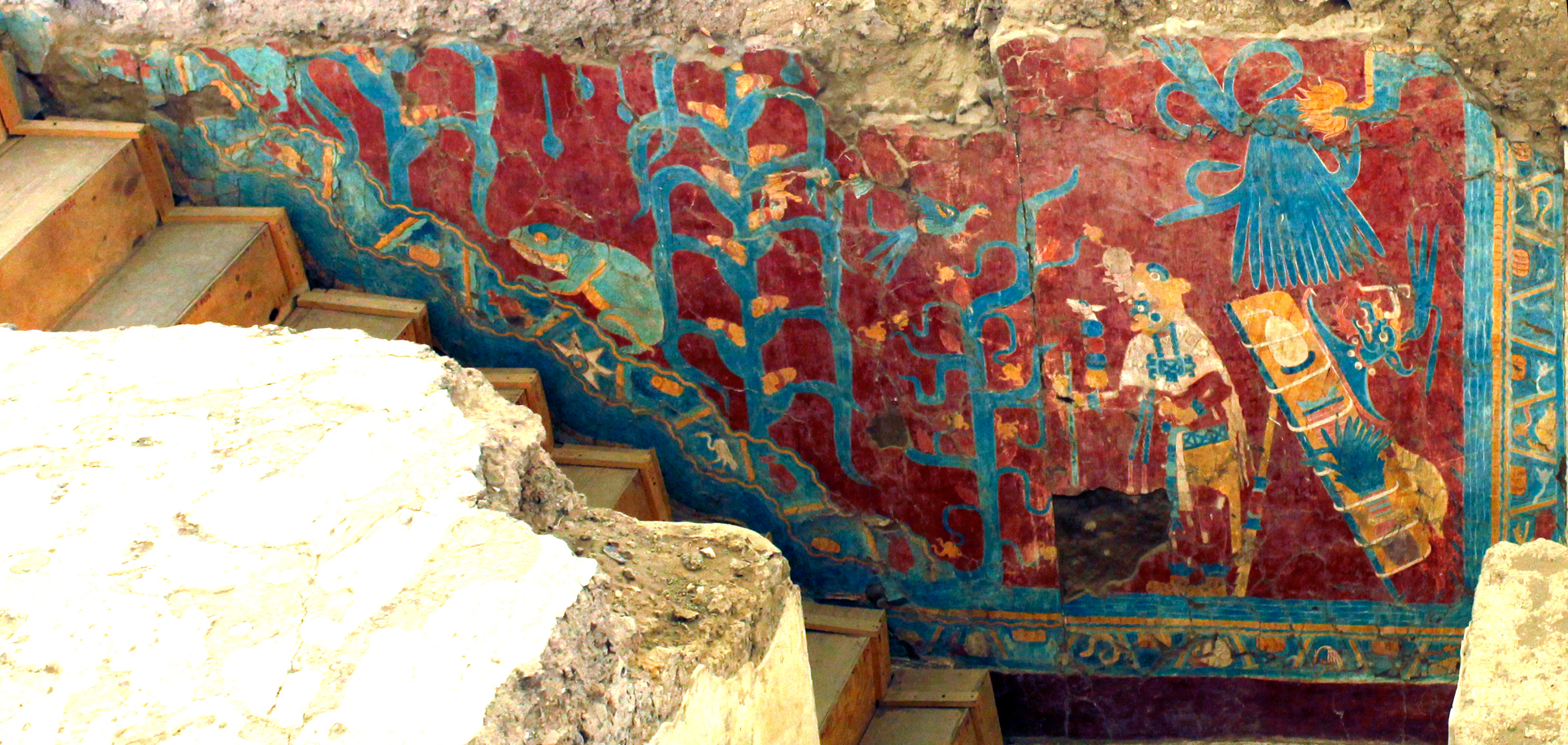
Mural del Templo Rojo (left side)

== Visiting the site ==
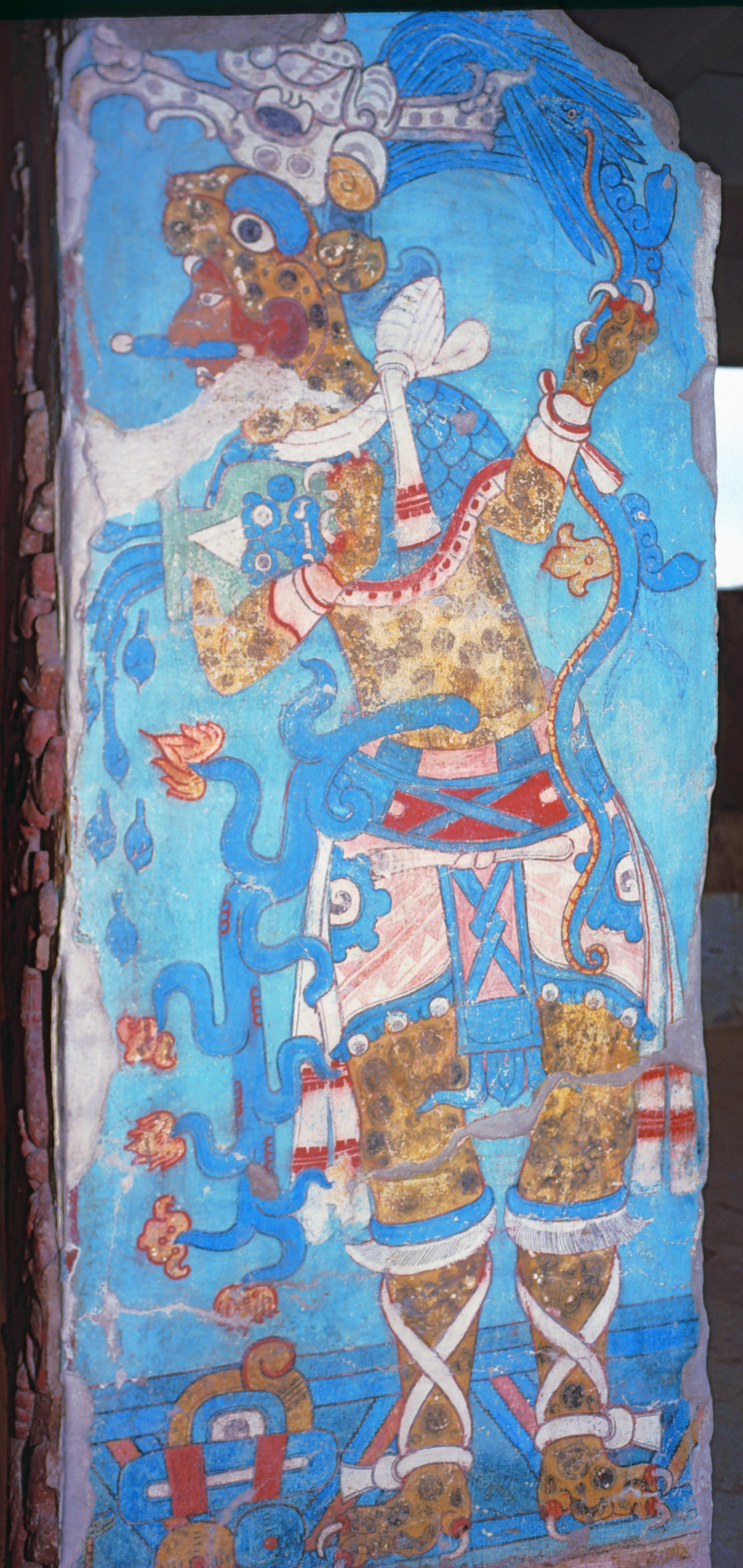
Priestly Attire, figure on right doorjamb

The archaeological site is maintained by the government's National Institute of Anthropology and History (INAH) and is open Wednesday to Sunday, from 8:00 to 17:30. Hours can be subject to change and it is advisable to check the INAH web site. The admission is 75 MXN on weekdays, and free on Sunday for Mexican Nationals. Permission to record videos costs another $50 MXN while photography is free.

Another nearby site associated with Cacaxtla is Xochitecatl which was a more public ceremonial complex.

== See also ==
- Xochitecatl, a neighbouring archaeological site, approximately 1 km to the west.
