= Xiuhcanahualtzin =

- Queen of Tlatelolco
- Issue: 3
- Father: Tezozomoc
- Mother: Queen Tzihuacxochitzin I

Xiuhcanahualtzin was a Princess of Azcapotzalco and Queen of Tlatelolco by marriage.

== Family ==
She was a daughter of the king Tezozomoc and Tzihuacxochitzin and sister of the king Quaquapitzahuac. She married her nephew Tlacateotl, who was a successor of his father Quaquapitzahuac as the king of Tlatelolco. They had three children; one of them was Itzquauhtzin.

She was also a sister of the king Maxtla.
