= Tepetate =

Mexican geological term

Tepetate (Spanish tepetate; Nahuatl tepetlatl) is a Mexican term for a geological horizon, hardened by compaction or cementation, found in Mexican volcanic regions. Tepetates at the surface are problematic for agriculture, because of their hardness, poor drainage, and poor fertility. When tepetates lie under the soil, they present a risk for erosion and landslides, because water runs off laterally, rather than being absorbed.

== See also ==
- Caliche (mineral)
