= Azcapotzalco (former administrative division) =

Coordinates: 19°29′10″N 99°11′05″W

Azcapotzalco was a Mexican municipality. It was disestablished in 1928, when the municipalities of the Federal District were replaced by boroughs (delegaciones). There is now a borough of the same name.
