= Maxtla =

- King of Azcapotzalco and Coyoacán
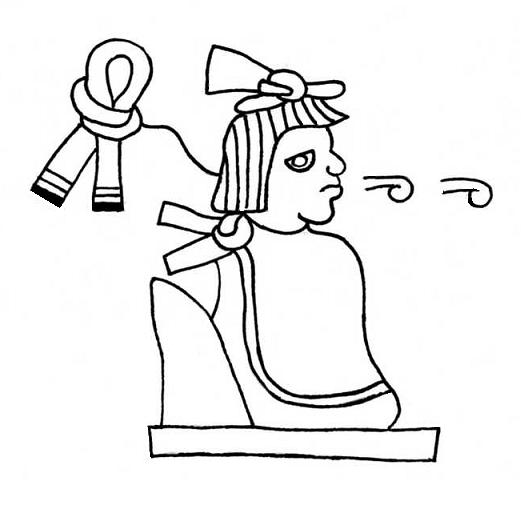
- Maxtla on the throne
- Died: 1428
- Issue: Tecollotzin
- Father: Tezozomoc
- Mother: Tzihuacxochitzin I

Maxtla (Nahuatl pronunciation: maštɬa) was a Tepanec ruler (tlatoani) of Azcapotzalco from 1426 to his death in 1428.

== Family ==
He was a son of the famous king Tezozomoc, who was a son of Acolnahuacatl and queen Cuetlaxochitzin.

His mother was queen Tzihuacxochitzin I, daughter of the noble dignitary Huitzilaztatzin.

He was a brother of the kings Aculnahuacatl Tzaqualcatl and Quaquapitzahuac and queens Xiuhcanahualtzin and Ayauhcihuatl. He was an uncle of Aztec emperor Chimalpopoca.

His elder half-brother was Tayatzin.

== Biography ==
Maxtla was installed as a ruler of Coyoacán. Upon Tezozomoc's death in the year Twelve Rabbit (1426), Tayatzin became a king, but Maxtla seized power at Azcapotzalco, leaving the rulership of Coyoacán to his son Tecollotzin.

Emperor Chimalpopoca of Tenochtitlan allied with Tayatzin, and the two conspired to retake the throne and kill Maxtla. Friendly relations between Tenochtitlan and Azcapotzalco were thus replaced by insults and violent intrigue, apparently involving tit-for-tat assassination attempts. Maxtla sent Chimalpopoca a present of women's clothing, and later arranged his assassination.

Tayatzin was killed, and Chimalpopoca decided to offer himself as a sacrifice at the altar of his father Huitzilíhuitl.

When Maxtla laid siege to Tenochtitlan in 1428, Chimalpopoca's successor and uncle, Itzcoatl, repelled his forces with the aid of an alliance of city states, including Texcoco under Nezahualcoyotl and many former Tepanec allies, notably Tlacopan. These allied forces sacked Azcapotzalco and Maxtla was personally sacrificed by Nezahualcoyotl, potentially because of the death of Nezahualcoyotl's father at the hands of Azcapotzalco's forces.

The victorious powers formalized their relationship in the Triple Alliance of Tenochtitlan, Texcoco and Tlacopan, which would become the basis of the Aztec Empire.
