= Matlalatzin =

- Queen of Tenochtitlan
- Spouse: Chimalpopoca
- Issue: 7
- Father: Quaquapitzahuac
- Mother: Acxocueitl

Matlalatzin was a Queen of Tenochtitlan as a wife of the king Chimalpopoca, and was a princess by birth. She was a daughter of Quaquapitzahuac, king of Tlatelolco, and sister of the king Tlacateotl and queen Huacaltzintli. She bore seven children.

She and her husband were cousins.

== See also ==
- Tezozomoc (son of Chimalpopoca)
- Huacaltzintli

== Notes ==
Regnal titles
Preceded by Wives of Huitzilihuitl	Queen of Tenochtitlan; 1417–1427 (estimated)	Succeeded by Wives of Itzcoatl
