= Tepanec =

Mesoamerican people

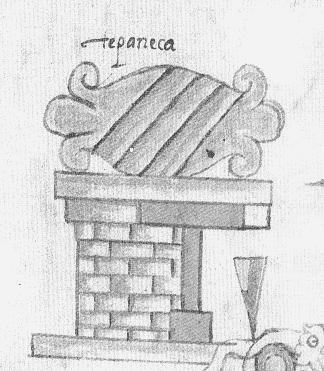
Glyph denoting Tepanecs

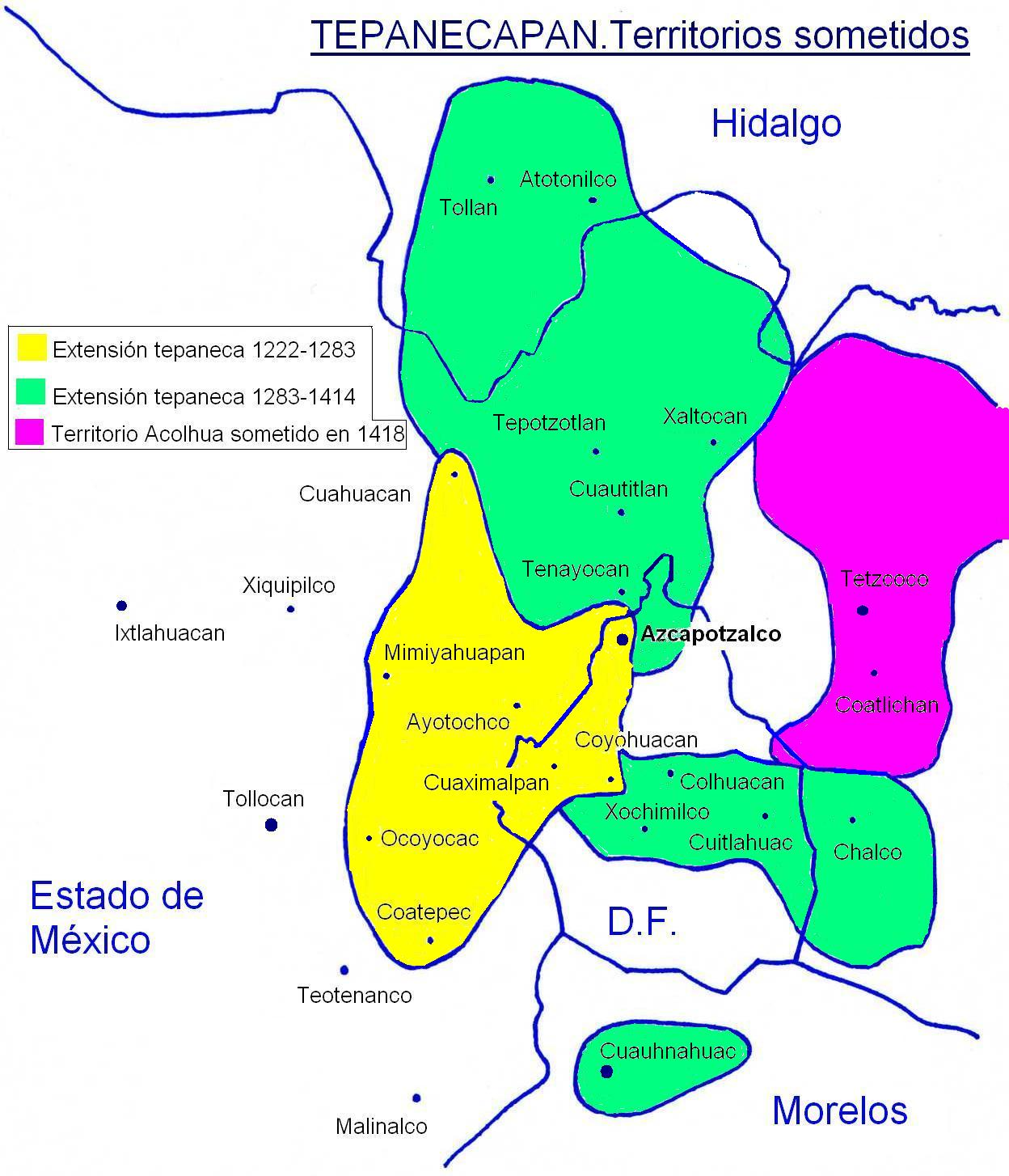
Territory dominated by Tepanecs.

The Tepanecs or Tepaneca are a Mesoamerican people who arrived in the Valley of Mexico in the late 12th or early 13th centuries. The Tepanec were a sister culture of the Aztecs (or Mexica) as well as the Acolhua and others—these tribes spoke the Nahuatl language and shared the same general pantheon, with local and tribal variations. However, some authors suspect the Tepaneca had partial Otomi or Matlatzinca origins. The patron deity of the Tepanec was Ototontecuhtli, also called Cuecuex, who was also a major deity among the Otomi, Matlatzinca and Mazahua people.

== Etymology ==
The name "Tepanecas" is a derivative term, corresponding to their original mythical city, Tepanohuayan (the passing by), also known as Tepano. Ideographically it is represented as a stone, for its etymology comes from Tepan (over the stones). (Note: There's no population called "Tepan". Tepanohuayan nonetheless is not only visualized as a mythical place, but is also used in the official colonial documents to refer to other Tepanec cities, such as Azcapotzalco-Tepanohuayan, Tlacopan-Tepanohuayan, Coyohuacan-Tepanohuayan, even close to Atlacuihuayan there was a population with the same name. The value of the city might be tied to the geographical location as it was the place to "pass" to the other side of the Texcoco lake.) Their conquered territories received the name Tepanecapan (land of the tepanecas) (lit. "over the tepanecas").

== History ==
Reputedly welcomed to the Valley of Mexico by the semi-legendary Chichimec (Note: The term "chichimec" is not referring, by the effects of this article, to the actual indigenous people in the north of Mexico, but to the idea the ancient mesoamerican population had of the nomadic and seminomadic people from Aridoamerica. In fact, after the fall of Tula in the 12th century, there was a massive migration of tribes which was integrated before to the politic Toltec unity (generally admitted by other tribes with the desire to acquire or assimilate the culture inherited by those groups), as well as the nomadic and seminomadic groups migrating from the north. This way, the tribes established in the Valley of Mexico, which consider themselves heirs of the Toltec cultural legacy, applied to the northern migrants the term chichimeca, as the opinion of Diego Muñoz Camargo it meant "wild men", pointing that "the name proceeds of men that eat uncooked meat and drank and sucked the blood of the animals they killed, as chichiliztli means in the Mexican tongue slang for sucking" (Historia de Tlaxcala, Germán Vázquez Edition, Crónicas de América 42, Dastin, Madrid, page. 84). This means chichimeca comes from the nahuatl verb "chichi" which means "to suck" and applied, contemptuously, to the "uncivilized" habits of those tribes. In this context, the term, chichimeca used by the ancient nahuas doesn't mean an ethnic origin common to the people who was called this, but as a derogatory term, to refer to the savages, barbarians or hillbillies. Nonetheless, is interesting to note that practically all the tribes in the Valley of Mexico refer to their chichimeca origin, exalting the warrior virtues of the nomadic tribes, tough and with an illustrious past (see: Fernando de Alva Ixtlilxóchitl, Obras Históricas, volume II, chapter. XV, page 39, and chapter XXXII, page 82, in which the author makes emphasis in the association of the acolhuas to the legendary chichimeca lineage Xólotl of Tenayuca).) ruler Xolotl, the Tepanecs settled on the west shores of Lake Texcoco. Under their tlatoani, Acolnahuacatl, the Tepanec took over Azcapotzalco from the indigenous inhabitants. In the early 14th century, Tezozomoc brought the Tepanec to the height of their power; at that point they controlled nearly all of the Valley of Mexico as well as parts of the Toluca and Morelos valleys. Native sources say that Tezozomoc lived to the age of over 100 and was legendary for his generalship and statesmanship.

The death of Tezozomoc in 1426 brought his sons Tayatzin and Maxtla to the throne, with Maxtla most likely poisoning Tayatzin. In 1428, Maxtla was overthrown by the nascent Aztec Triple Alliance, which included the Mexicas of Tenochtitlan and the Acolhua of Texcoco, as well as Maxtla's fellow Tepanecs of Tlacopan. With the rise of the Aztec empire, Tlacopan became the predominant Tepanec city, although both Tenochtitlan and Texcoco eclipsed Tlacopan in size and prestige.

According to the tradition recompiled by several historians, the Tepanec people constituted one of the seven tribes that started the migration from Chicomoztoc (in nahuatl, "The Seven Caves"), a place which has no certain location. During the middle of the 20th century, the general opinion was that La Quemada had to be the place, but in the opinion of later investigators, the city must have been north of the Valley of Mexico, or towards the ancient Tula, even in the Chiconauhtla hill, south of Teotihuacan. The Tepaneca tribe claimed, by their military might, one of the best zones where they founded Azcapotzalco, the main altepetl of their territory, known as Tepanecapan.

When the Spaniard conquistadores arrived to the Valley of Mexico, the Tepaneca tribe was subject to the Triple Alliance, led by Tenochtitlan, and was not able to remain an independent ethnic group. We know of their existence thanks to references in stories derived from the prehispanic codex traditions, which were compiled by novohispanic historians.
