= Quaquapitzahuac =

- Glyph of Tlatelolco

King of Tlatelolco
- Reign: 1376 - 1417
- Predecessor: Tezozomoc
- Successor: Tlacateotl
- Died: 1417
- Spouse: Acxocueitl
- Issue: King Tlacateotl; Queen Matlalatzin; Queen Huacaltzintli
- Father: Tezozomoc

Quaquapitzahuac (died 1417) was the first ruler of the Aztec city of Tlatelolco. His name, which means "Slender Horn", was pronounced [kʷaːkʷaʍpiˈtsaːwak] in Classical Nahuatl, and is also spelled Cuacuauhpitzahuac, Cuacuapitzahuac, and Quaquauhpitzahuac.

His nephew was Tecollotzin.

== Reign ==
Quaquapitzahuac was appointed by his father, Tezozomoc, in 1376 to serve as the first tlatoani of Tlatelolco, thus beginning that city's royal house. Under his rule, Tlatelolcan armies participated in various conquests on behalf of the city of Azcapotzalco, winning the right to receive tribute from the conquered towns in the east of the valley of Mexico.

== Family ==
He was a son of famous Tezozomoc, the Tepanec ruler of Azcapotzalco.

He was a brother of the kings Aculnahuacatl Tzaqualcatl, Tzihuactlayahuallohuatzin, Maxtla, Epcoatl and the queen Ayauhcihuatl.

His wife was called Acxocueitl.

Upon his death in 1417, he was succeeded by his son Tlacateotl. He was also a father of the queens Matlalatzin (wife of Chimalpopoca) and Huacaltzintli (wife of Itzcoatl).

He was a grandfather of the prince Tezozomoc.

Preceded by —	Tlatoani of Tlatelolco; 1376–1417	Succeeded by Tlacateotl
