= Huacaltzintli =

- Queen consort of Tenochtitlan
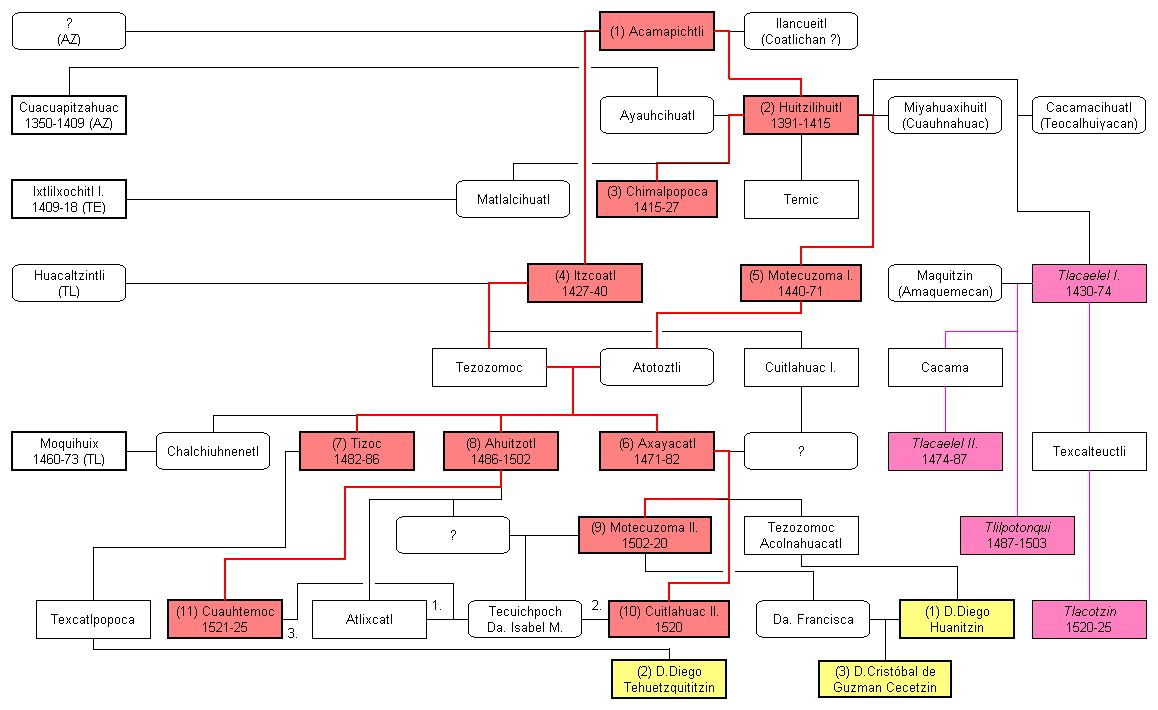
- Family tree of Tenochtitlan royal family. Huacaltzintli's name is here, and also the names of her husband and son.
- Spouse: Emperor Itzcoatl
- Issue: Tezozomoc
- Father: King Quaquapitzahuac
- Religion: Aztec religion

Huacaltzintli was a Princess of Tlatelolco and Queen of Tenochtitlan. She was a daughter of the king Quaquapitzahuac and sister of the king Tlacateotl and queen Matlalatzin. Her husband was Itzcoatl, Aztec emperor. She gave birth to a son, who she named Tezozomoc. She was a grandmother of kings Axayacatl, Tizoc, and Ahuitzotl.

== See also ==
- Anales de Tlatelolco
- List of Tenochtitlan rulers
- Chichimecacihuatzin I
- Aztec emperors family tree

Regnal titles
Preceded by Wives of Chimalpopoca	Queen of Tenochtitlan; 1427–1440 (estimated)	Succeeded by Wives of Moctezuma I
