= Azcapotzalco (altepetl) =

Pre-Columbian state in the Valley of Mexico

- 995–1428
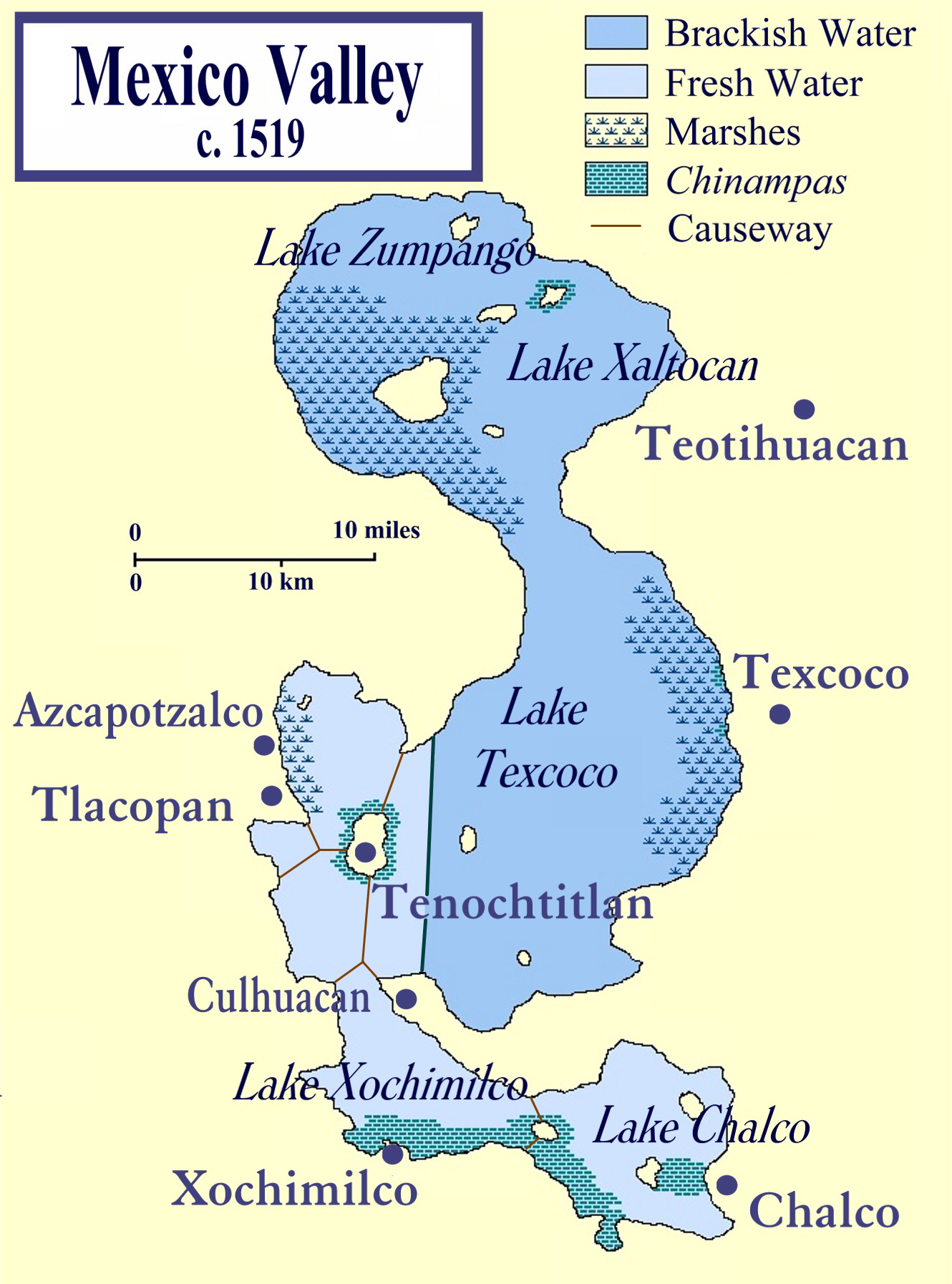
- Map of the Valley of Mexico at the time of the Spanish Conquest showing the location of Azcapotzalco.
- Capital: Azcapotzalco
- Common languages: Nahuatl
- Religion: Pre-Columbian Nahua religion
- Government: Monarchy
- Historical era: Pre-Columbian
  - Established: 995
  - Incorporated into Aztec Empire: 1428
Succeeded by
Aztec Empire

Azcapotzalco was a pre-Columbian Nahua altepetl (state), capital of the Tepanec empire, in the Valley of Mexico, on the western shore of Lake Texcoco. The name Azcapotzalco means "at the anthill" in Nahuatl. Its inhabitants were called Azcapotzalca. According to the 17th-century annalist Chimalpahin, Azcapotzalco was founded by Chichimecs in the year 995 AD. The most famous ruler (tlatoani) of Azcapotzalco was Tezozomoctli.

== History ==
According to chronicler Fernando Alva Ixtlilxóchitl, the Tepanecs were a Chichimec group that settled in 1012 in the region west of Lake Texcoco. Their lineage began when their Acolhua leader (or Acolnahuacatl) married Xolotl's daughter Cuetlaxochitzin. But this information is apocryphal, since Acolnahuacatl's life is considered to have occurred much later.

Chimalpahin places their settlement before, in 995. In fact, archaeological investigations have revealed that Azcapotzalco was inhabited since the Classical period — around year 600 — and were related to the Teotihuacan’s culture and language, as it is known that they still spoke the Otomi language in the 14th century while Nahuatl was the lingua franca from 1272 on. Continuing with data provided by Chimalpahin, he mentions that Tepanecs entered the Triple Alliance from 1047 (this Alliance is different from a much later alliance involving the Aztecs).

The documents indicate that last line starts with Matlacohuatl. The second tlatoani was Chiconquiauhtzin.

Azcapotzalco was founded in the 13th century in the west of Lake Texcoco. Azcapotzalco maintained a dominant hegemony with the Aztecs, who arrived in 1299, settling on the Chapultepec Hill, and were dominated.

Allowed the Mexitin establishment in Chapultepec in 1281–1286 so they expelled the Matlatzincas-Texcaltepecas (Texcaltepec; former name of the village of Malinalco), also remained neutral when a four Nation coalition razed the Chapoltepec Mexitin and Santa Catarina Sierra in 1299, when they are subjected to the Colhuacan yoke. In 1318 for the first time they attacked the Aztecs, which resulted in an increased tribute and greater participation in military campaigns.

Around of 1315, the Tepanec, Toltec and Chichimec drove the Aztecs definitively from Chapultepec. Copil was captured and killed by the Aztecs. His heart was ripped out and thrown into the River. According to a legend, Huitzilopochtli had to kill his nephew, Copil and threw his heart in the Lake. However, since Copil was his relative, Huitzilopochtli decided to honor him and made a cactus grow over Copil heart and it became a sacred place.

The Aztecs attempted to ally with the Colhua to confront the Tepanec: they were allowed to settle in Tizapán, near Colhuacan. In 1323, the Aztecs slaughtered a Colhua Princess in front of her father. The Colhua had been expelled from Tizapán and immediately declared war.

The Aztecs called for immediate Azcapotzalco protection, and from this point forward they were subject to military, economic and strategic decisions of the Tepanecas.

At Acolnahuacatl's death, his son Tezozomoc, only 23 years old, took his place; Tezozomoc may be the most important and crucial post-classical period figure. During his reign (ca. 1371–1426), Azcapotzalco reached its greatest splendor. At the time of his death in 1426, Azcapotzalco was an authentic "Hueyi Tlahtohcayotl"; it controlled trade routes at least 40 altépetl. His political decisions both destroyed villages and favored the emergence of others. He installed his sons on the thrones of many nearby altépetl, such as his son Cuacuapitzahuac who ruled Tlatelolco until 1407.

The later supremacy of Tenochtitlan was a result of Tezozómoc's policies. Tezozómoc forced the Aztecs to fight with him and together conquered the city of Colhuacan in 1385. Between 1414–1418, Azcapotzalco controlled the entire Valley of Mexico, thanks to the decisive contribution of Aztec and mercenary forces and a series of careful pacts with regional people. Azcapotzalco became an economic center of enormous power.

In 1426, When Tezozómoc died, his son Maxtla took power. Maxtla failed to maintain alliances and lost the crucial support of the Aztecs by arranging for the assassination of their tlatoani Chimalpopoca. As a result, Tenochtitlan banded together with its neighbors, including Texcoco and Tlacopan, into what became known as the (second) Triple Alliance. Together they attacked and sacked Azcapotzalco in 1428. Hegemonic power passed to Tenochtitlan and, consequently, to the Aztec Empire.
