= Cabildo of San Juan Tenochtitlan =

Cabildo of Spain

The cabildo of San Juan Tenochtitlan was a governing council established in the 16th century to give a Spanish-style government to Tenochtitlan.

The cabildo consisted of a single governor, a number of alcaldes and regidores, and a number of other minor officials.

The cabildo was abolished in 1812 through the Spanish Constitution of 1812.

== Governor ==
Early post-tlatoani governors

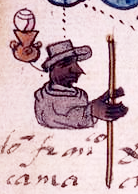
Francisco Jiménez
1568–1569

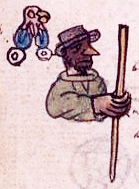
Antonio Valeriano
1573–1599

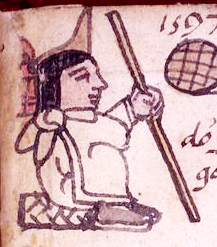
Melchor de Mendoza
1593–1593

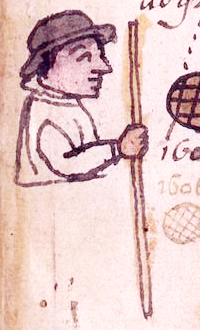
Gerónimo López
1599–1608

Initially the governorship was given to the tlatoani (indigenous dynastic ruler) and many early governors were thus referred to by the Spaniards as cacique y gobernador ("Indian ruler and governor") or señor y gobernador ("lord and governor"). The last tlatoani of Tenochtitlan was Luis de Santa María Nanacacipactzin (1563–1565). Governors who also were tlatoani or cuauhtlatoani (interim ruler) are indicated in the list.

Subsequent (non-dynastic) governors were referred to juez-gobernador ("judge-governor") or simply gobernador ("governor"). In 1564, the governor received a salary of 400 pesos per year.

1. Cuauhtémoc (1521–1525; also tlatoani)
2. Juan Velázquez Tlacotzin (1525–1525/1526; also cuauhtlatoani)
3. Andrés de Tapia Motelchiuh (1526–1531; also cuauhtlatoani)
4. Pablo Xochiquentzin (1532–1536; also cuauhtlatoani)
5. Diego de Alvarado Huanitzin (1538–1541; also tlatoani)
6. Diego de San Francisco Tehuetzquititzin (1541–1554; also tlatoani)
7. Esteban de Guzmán Omacatzin (1554–1557; only as judge)
8. Cristóbal de Guzmán Cecetzin (1557–1562; also tlatoani)
9. Luis de Santa María Nanacacipactzin (1563–1565; also tlatoani)
10. Francisco Jiménez (1568–1569)
11. Antonio Valeriano (1573–1599)
12. Melchor de Mendoza (1593–1593)
13. Gerónimo López (1599–1608)
14. Juan Bautista (1609–1610)
15. Juan Pérez de Monterrey (1610–1614)
16. Francisco Bautista Valeriano (1616–1618)
17. Jerónimo de León (1619)
18. Antonio Valeriano “El Joven” (1620–1621)
19. Diego Carrillo (1622–1628)
20. Juan de León (1629–1633)
21. Cristóbal Pascual (1634–1639)
22. Martín González (1640–1647)
23. Manuel de Tapia Moctezuma (1648–1653)
24. Diego de la Cruz (1654-1654)
25. Juan de Aguilar (1654-1654)
26. Juan de Velasco (1654-1654)
27. Diego de la Cruz Villanueva (1655–1656)
28. Marcos de la Cruz (1657-1657)
29. Pedro Bernal (1657–1658)
30. Francisco Benítez Ynga (1659-1660)
31. Francisco Benítez (1660–1664)
32. Lorenzo de Santiago (1665–1666)
33. Felipe de Aguilera (1667–1668)
34. Felipe de Aguilar (1669–1674)
35. Mateo Salvador (1675-1675)
36. Juan de Aguilar (1675-1676)
37. Juan Bautista Valeriano (1676-1677)
38. Gregorio de los Reyes (1677)
39. Juan de Xara (1678–1681)
40. Matías de los Ángeles (1682)
41. Bernardino Antonio de la Cruz (1684)
42. Matías de la Cruz (1685)
43. José de la Cruz (1686)
44. Bernardino Antonio de la Cruz (1687)
45. Matías de los Ángeles (1688)
46. Bernardino Antonio de la Cruz (1688)

== Alcaldes ==
New alcaldes were elected yearly. Until 1600, Tenochtitlan was served by two alcaldes. In odd-numbered years, the alcaldes would be representatives of the "barrios" of San Pablo Teopan and San Juan Moyotlan, while in even years, the alcaldes would be representatives of San Sebastián Atzaqualco and Santa María la Redonda Cuepopan. In 1600, the number of alcaldes was increased to four, one for each district; in 1610 it was increased again to eight, with two for each district.

In 1564, alcaldes were receiving salaries of 50 pesos.

| 1555 | Alonso de San Miguel (San Pablo) | Miguel Díaz (San Juan) |
| 1556 | Miguel Sánchez Yscatl (San Sebastián) | Cristóbal de Guzmán Cecetzin (Santa María) |
| 1557 | Tomás de Aquino Yspopulac (San Pablo) | Luis de Santa María Nanacacipactzin (San Juan) |
| 1558 | Martín Cano (San Sebastián) | Pedro de la Cruz Tlapaltecatl (Santa María) |
| 1559 | Pedro García Tenylotl (San Pablo) | Lucas Cortés Tenamaz (San Juan) |
| 1560 | Miguel Sánchez Yscatl (San Sebastián) | Melchior Díaz Suchipepena (Santa María) |
| 1561 | Luis de Paz Huehuezaca (San Pablo) | Toribio Vásquez Tlacuscalcal (San Juan) |
| 1562 | Martín Cano (San Sebastián) | Pedro de la Cruz Tlapaltecatl (Santa María) |
| 1563 | Tomás de Aquino Yspopulac (San Pablo) | Lucas Cortés Tenamaz (San Juan) |
| 1564 | Martín de San Juan Ezmalin (San Sebastián) | Antonio de Santa María Mexicaytoa (Santa María) |
| 1565 | Pedro Dionisio (San Pablo) | Toribio Vásquez Tlacuscalcal (San Juan) |
| 1566 | Miguel Sánchez Yscatl (San Sebastián) | Francisco Xuárez (Santa María) |
| 1567 | Luis de Paz Huehuezaca (San Pablo) | Martín Hernández Acatecatl (San Juan) |
| 1568 | Juan García Totoco (San Sebastián) | Diego de Tovar (Santa María) |

== Regidores ==
Tenochtitlan had twelve regidores, an unusually high number. Like alcaldes, regidores represented the four subdivisions of Tenochtitlan, although with disproportionate representation of San Juan Moyotlan.

In 1564, regidores were receiving salaries of 20 pesos.
