= Acamapichtli =

First Tlatoani of Tenochtitlan

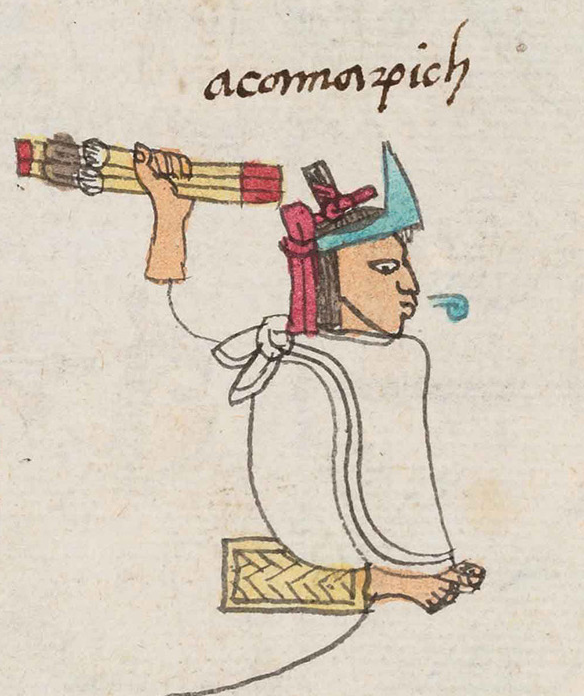
- Glyph of Acamapichtli, c. 1541

Tlatoani of Tenochtitlan Ruler of the Aztec Triple Alliance, Cihuacoatl
- Reign: 1367–1387, 1376–1395 or 1350–1403
- Predecessor: Ilancueitl
- Successor: Huitzilihuitl
- Died: 1387, 1395 or 1403
- Wives: Ilancueitl Tezcatlan Miyahuatzin Huitzilxotzin Xiuhcuetzin; other wives
- Issue: Huitzilihuitl; Itzcoatl; Tlatolqaca; Quatlecoatl; Matlalxoch other children
- Father: Opochtli Iztahuatzin
- Mother: Princess Atotoztli I

Acamapichtli (Classical Nahuatl: Ācamāpichtli [aːkamaːˈpit͡ʃt͡ɬi], meaning "Handful of reeds") was the first Tlatoani, or king, of the Aztecs (or Mexica) of Tenochtitlan, and founder of the Aztec imperial dynasty. Chronicles differ as to the dates of his reign: according to the Codex Chimalpahin, he reigned from 1367 to 1387; according to the Codex Aubin, he reigned from 1376 to 1395; and according to the Codex Chimalpopoca, he reigned from 1350 to 1403.

== Biography ==
=== Family and early life ===
Acamapichtli was not a native of Tenochtitlan. Blood relationships between rulers were an important aspect of politics in 14th century Mexico, and as relative newcomers, the Mexicans were at a disadvantage. On the death of Tenoch, the elders of the Mexica calpultin decided to elect a tlatoani who could secure the fledgling city's position through ties to powerful groups in the region. They sent a delegation to the leaders of Culhuacan. Although the Culhua had only recently ejected the Mexica from Tizaapan, some intermarriage had taken place between the two peoples during their period of association. Acamapichtli was the product of one such union. His father, Opochtli Iztahuatzin, was a Mexican leader, while his mother Atotoztli I was the daughter of the King Coxcoxtli and sister of King Huehue Acamapichtli. He also had ties to the Acolhua of Coatlinchan. In addition to these concrete ties, the Culhua nobility claimed direct descent from the Toltecs, making their bloodline particularly prestigious.

The Spanish colonial historians Diego Durán, Fernando de Alva Cortés Ixtlilxochitl, and Fernando Alvarado Tezozómoc each mention Acamapichtli's maternal uncle, who occupied the throne of Culhuacan in 1324.

=== Reign ===
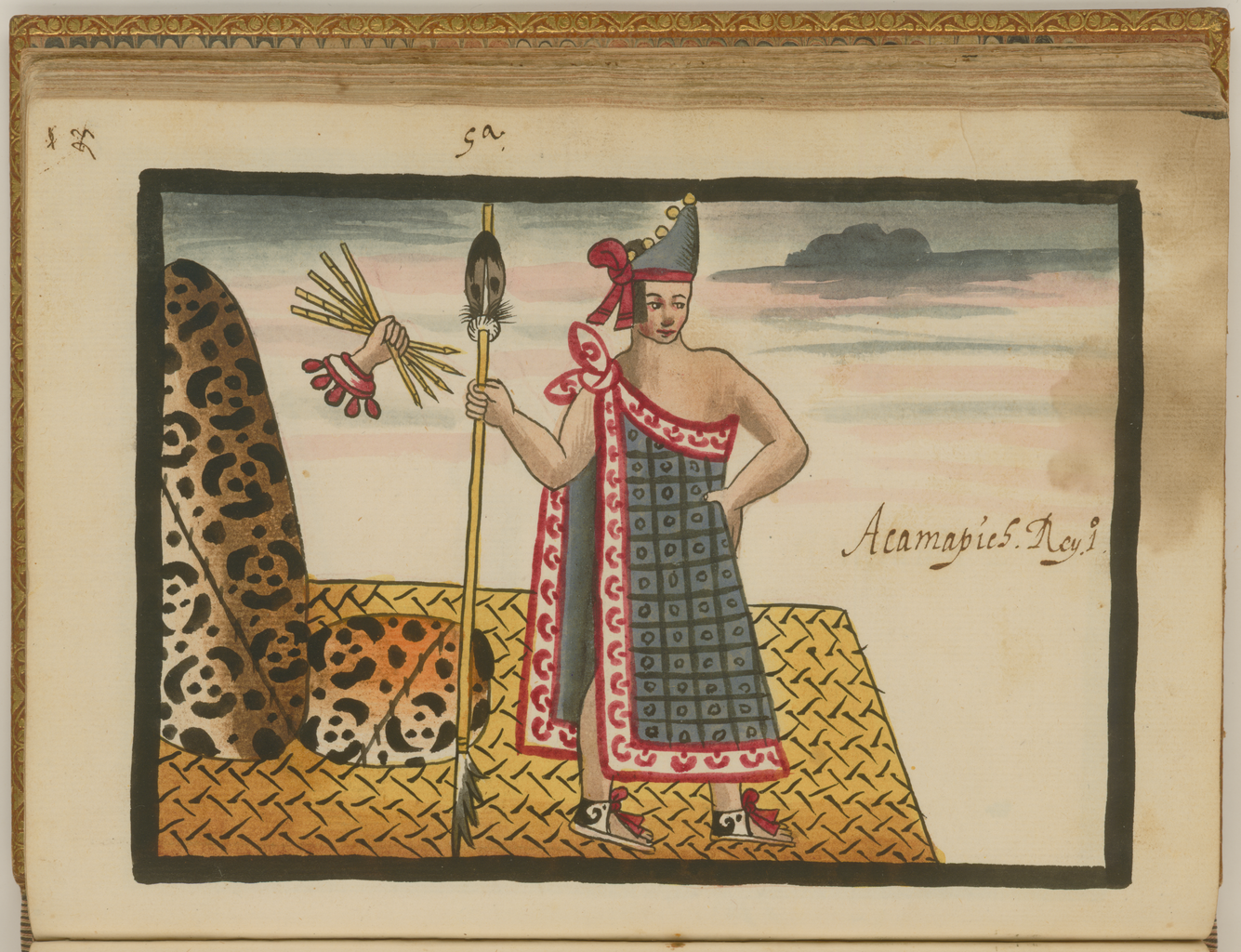
Acamapichtli as depicted in the Tovar Codex.

Acamapichtli began his rule as cihuacóatl (governor). At the time of his designation he was 20 years old, living in Texcoco with his mother. After his acceptance of the throne, he was brought to Tenochtitlan and made his entry into the city with great pomp. He married Ilancueitl, daughter of the then ruler of Culhuacán, Acolmiztli.

To integrate these ties with the city of Tenochtitlan, Acamapichtli took a wife from each Tenochtitlan calpulli (in addition to his first wife Ilancuetl).

In the same year, Tenochtitlan's sister city of Tlatelolco also installed an outsider as tlatoani — Cuacuapitzahuac, son of Tezozómoc, tlatoani of the Tepanec city of Azcapotzalco, the other major power in the region.

Despite Acamapichtli's Culhua ancestry, his city rapidly fell into the Tepanec orbit and became a tributary of Azcapotzalco. During his reign Mexica forces fought for Azcapotzalco against various city states, notably Chalco, and were eventually allowed to wage war on their own. Expeditions were sent against Cuauhnahuac (modern Cuernavaca), Xochimilco, Cuitlahuac, Mixquic, Cuautinchán and the Mazahua.

Tribute was due to the Tecpanec rulers every full moon, a tribute said to be oppressive and capricious. In spite of the hostility of Azcapotzalco, Tenochtitlan progressed. The island on which the city was situated (and the only territory subject to its rule) was enlarged to the east with the addition of dirt and rock. The Mexica were careful, however, to maintain a proper distance from the mainland, for defensive purposes in the event of war.

Built in the middle of Lake Texcoco, Tenochtitlan suffered from limited farmland. Acamapichtli built up the city's agricultural base by expanding the chinampa system ("floating" gardens) around the island, and by capturing lakeshore chinampas from other cities, particularly Xochimilco. He also made improvements to the city's architecture — the earliest excavated level of the Great Pyramid, Temple II, dates to his reign.

During his reign, the city was divided into four neighborhoods or calpullis: Moyotlán in the southwest; Zoquipan in the southeast; Cuecopan in the northwest; and Atzacualco in the northeast. Houses of cane and reeds were replaced with houses of stone. A great temple, or teocalli, was also constructed. It is said that during his reign, the first Aztec laws were made.

In 1382, Acamapichtli was named tlatoani. He was crowned with even more pomp than before, at the altar of Huitzilopochtli. He ascended the steps accompanied by the highest-ranking warriors. He was anointed with oil and water by the chief priest, who placed on his head the crown or xiuhuitzolli. This same ceremony was repeated in all the subsequent Aztec coronations, with the difference that, from 1427, the new tlatoani was accompanied by the rulers of Texcoco and Tlacopan, the other two towns of the Aztec Triple Alliance.

Acamapichtli was an astute politician who strengthened his position more by alliances with his neighbors than by wars (of which there were only two or three during his reign). He avoided difficulties with the more powerful rulers, in the case of Tezozómoc, by paying the demanded tribute. Tezozómoc asked for a chinampa cultivated with beautiful flowers, and the Aztecs formed one, raised the flowers, and floated the chinampa to him over the lake.

=== Heirs and succession ===
Acamapichtli's first wife bore him no children, so he took another wife, Tezcatlan Miyahuatzin, a daughter of Acacitli. She was the mother of Huitzilíhuitl, who succeeded to the throne after the death of his father. Another son of Acamapichtli, Itzcóatl, also became tlatoani in 1427. He was the son of a slave Acamapichtli had bought in the market of Azcapotzalco. She was of noble birth, but had been captured and enslaved. Although tlatoani was not strictly a hereditary title, candidates were clearly restricted to a small class of princes, and all later Aztec rulers descended from Acamapichtli.

Before his death, Acamapichtili called together the chiefs of the four neighborhoods into which he had divided the city, and asked them to elect his successor. Before the death of Acamapichtili, they chose his eldest son Huitzilíhuitl. Acamapichtili approved the election, and then died. After the death of his father, Huitzilíhuitl consolidated his power by ordering a new election, with more electors, including important warriors and priests.

== Personal life ==
Among his wives were Ilancueitl, Tezcatlan Miyahuatzin, Huitzilxotzin, and Xiuhcuetzin.

== See also ==
- List of Tenochtitlan rulers

== Bibliography ==
- Susan D. Gillespie (2016) [1989]. The Aztec Kings: The Construction of Rulership in Mexican History. University of Arizona Press. ISBN 978-0-8165-3478-4.
- Hubert Howe Bancroft (1876). The Native Races of the Pacific States of North America: Primitive history. 1876. Vol. 5. D. Appleton.
- (in Spanish) "Acamapichtili", Enciclopedia de México, v. 1. Mexico City: 1987.
- (in Spanish) García Puron, Manuel, México y sus gobernantes,, v. 1. Mexico City: Joaquín Porrua, 1984.
- (in Spanish) Orozco Linares, Fernando, Gobernantes de México. Mexico City: Panorama Editorial, 1985, ISBN 968-38-0260-5.
- (in Spanish) Tezozómoc, Fernando Alvarado, Crónica mexicana. 1891.
- (in Spanish) Tezozómoc, Fernando Alvarado, Crónica mexicayotl. 1949.

Regnal titles
Preceded by Position created	Tlatoani of Tenochtitlan; 1376–1395	Succeeded by Huitzilihuitl
