= Xiuhcuetzin =

Queen of Tenochtitlan
- Tenure: 1376–1395 (estimated) - fellow consorts included Ilancueitl, Tezcatlan Miyahuatzin, and Huitzilxotzin
- Issue: Prince Quatlecoatl
- Father: Ahatl
- Religion: Aztec religion

Xiuhcuetzin was a Queen of Tenochtitlan as a wife of Aztec emperor Acamapichtli. She was a daughter of Ahatl and mother of Prince Quatlecoatl.

== See also ==
- List of Tenochtitlan rulers
- Huitzilxotzin

== Sources ==
- Chimalpahin Cuauhtlehuanitzin, Domingo Francisco de San Antón Muñón (1997). "Mexican History or Chronicle". Codex Chimalpahin: society and politics in Mexico Tenochtitlan, Tlatelolco, Texcoco, Culhuacan, and other Nahua altepetl in central Mexico: the Nahuatl and Spanish annals and accounts collected by don Domingo de San Antón Muñón Chimalpahin Quauhtlehuanitzin. Edited and translated by Arthur J. O. Anderson and Susan Schroeder. Norman: University of Oklahoma Press. pp. 25–177. ISBN 0-8061-2921-2.

Regnal titles
Preceded by Position created	Queen of Tenochtitlan; 1376–1395 (estimated)	Succeeded by Wives of Huitzilihuitl
