= Ilancueitl =

First queen of Tenochtitlan

Ilancuéitl
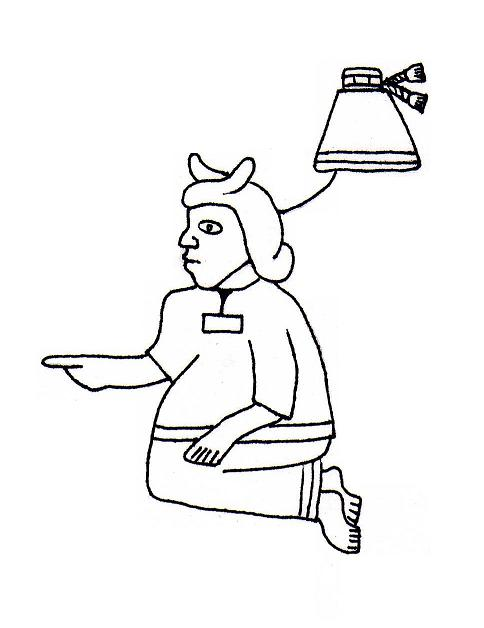
- A drawing of Ilancuéitl

Cihuātlahtoāni of Tenochtitlan
- Predecessor: Teuhtlehuatzin
- Successor: Acamapichtli
- Spouse: King Acamapichtli
- Father: King Acolmiztli

Ilancueitl (Nahuatl for "old-woman skirt"; pronounced [ilaŋˈkʷeː.itɬ]) was the first queen of Tenochtitlan.

== Biography ==
Ilancuéitl was a daughter of the then ruler of Culhuacán, Acolmiztli, and she married her nephew Acamapichtli, who thus became the first ruler of Tenochtitlan. She bore no children, so her husband took more wives.

Ilancuéitl charged herself with the education of her stepson Huitzilihuitl.

Some sourced claimed that Ilancuéitl actually became ruler of Tenochtitlan herself.

== See also ==
- List of Tenochtitlan rulers

Regnal titles
Preceded by Position created	Queen of Tenochtitlan; 1376–1395 (estimated)	Succeeded by Wives of Huitzilihuitl
