= Huitzilxotzin =

Tenochca noble

- Queen of Tenochtitlan
- Spouse: King Acamapichtli
- Issue: Prince Tlatolqaca
- Father: Tenqacatetl

Huitzilxotzin (modern Nahuatl pronunciation) was a Queen of Tenochtitlan as a wife of Aztec emperor Acamapichtli. She was a daughter of Tenqacatetl and mother of Prince Tlatolqaca. She was a grandmother of Princes Cahualtzin, Tetlepanquetzatzin and Tecatlapohuatzin.

== See also ==
- List of Tenochtitlan rulers
- Xiuhcuetzin

== Sources ==
- Chimalpahin Cuauhtlehuanitzin, Domingo Francisco de San Antón Muñón (1997). "Mexican History or Chronicle". Codex Chimalpahin: society and politics in Mexico Tenochtitlan, Tlatelolco, Texcoco, Culhuacan, and other Nahua altepetl in central Mexico: the Nahuatl and Spanish annals and accounts collected by don Domingo de San Antón Muñón Chimalpahin Quauhtlehuanitzin. Edited and translated by Arthur J. O. Anderson and Susan Schroeder. Norman: University of Oklahoma Press. pp. 25–177. ISBN 0-8061-2921-2.

Regnal titles
Preceded by Position created	Queen of Tenochtitlan; 1376–1395 (estimated)	Succeeded by Wives of Huitzilihuitl
