= Antonio Valeriano (the younger) =

Don Antonio Valeriano, the younger was a colonial Mexican Nahua politician.

== Family ==
Don Antonio Valeriano was born to don Diego Valeriano and doña María. His paternal grandfather and namesake, Antonio Valeriano the elder, was a prominent member of society in Tenochtitlan and Azcapotzalco, serving as governor in both places, as Antonio Valeriano the younger later would. His paternal grandmother was doña Isabel, a daughter of don Diego de Alvarado Huanitzin, ruler of Tenochtitlan. His mother's father was don Alonso Tezozomoctzin, ruler of Azcapotzalco Mexicapan.

On October 10, 1610, he married doña Bárbara, his niece. They had a son named Nicolás.

== Career ==
He served as alcalde for San Juan Moyotlan in the cabildo of San Juan Tenochtitlan from 1608 to 1610. He was a fiscal in 1611 before becoming governor of Azcapotzalco on November 17 that year. Later in the 1620s he was governor of Tenochtitlan.
