= Chimalxochitl II =

- Queen of Cuautitlan and Princess of the Aztecs
- Reign: Early 14th century
- Coronation: Early 14th century
- Born: Late 13th century Chapultepec
- Died: 14th century
- Spouse: King Quinatzin of Cuautitlan
- Issue: High Steward Tlazanotztoc of Tepotzotlan King Tezcatltecuhtli of Cuautitlan Prince Teozatzin Prince Tochtzin Unknown female
- Classical Nahuatl: Chīmalxōchitl
- House: First Aztec Royal House
- Father: Huehue Huitzilihuitl
- Religion: Tezcatlipocan Aztec Religion

Chimalxochitl II (b. before 1299), also known as Chimallaxochitzin, Chimallaxoch, Chimalacaxochitl or Chīmalxōchitl in Classical Nahuatl, was Queen consort of the Cuautitlan Kingdom and Princess of the Aztecs. She was the sole survivor of the Aztec royal family during the Chapultepec War and a defender of her religious beliefs as a woman.

In Nahuatl, her name denotes the common sunflower (Helianthus annuus) and translates literally as "Shield-Flower."

== Family ==
Chimalxochitl was daughter of Huehue Huitzilihuitl, King of the Aztecs. Her paternal grandfather was Nezahualtemocatzin, a nobleman from Zumpango Kingdom. She was a member of the first ruling house of the Aztecs, and the only ruling house of the Aztec people before the creation of the Aztec Empire.

== Background ==
Born in late 13th century, she was Princess of the Aztecs while living in Chapultepec Hill years before they established their famous capital Mexico Tenochtitlan or even became the Aztec Empire.

Chapultepec Hill was formally the first place where the Aztecs founded their first city and established their first state. Lack of available land and years of migration forced the founding of their new country in this small hill where people were already living there.

Surrounded by powerful kingdoms, the Aztecs attempted to establish their legitimacy with a ruling royal family, which Chimalxochitl was part of.

== Chapultepec War ==
=== Origins ===
The arrival of the Aztecs from what is today northern North America to Chapultepec caused discomfort amongst neighboring nations, especially because of their behavior towards the population that was already living there. Another issue was that the Aztecs were viewed as being dangerous since they were perceived to be war-like and neighboring nations didn't want their former mercenaries to achieve statehood.

=== Belligerents ===
The newly founded Aztec state was founded exactly in the border of three kingdoms: Azcapotzalco, Culhuacan, and Coatlinchan. So these kingdoms decided to unite, create a coalition with allied nations like Xaltocan to destroy the Aztec settlement in Chapultepec.

=== Outcome ===
The Aztecs were defeated, and the Aztec senior royal members were captured, each to be executed in the different capitals of the victors. Chimalxochitl was rendered nude along with her family and paraded. Once this was done, Chimalxochitl was taken by the warriors of the Xaltocan Kingdom, intended to be executed in their capital.

=== Rescue of Chimalxochitl ===
On their way to Xaltocan, the Xaltocan warriors stopped at Iltitlan to ritually bathe Chimalxochitl before her execution. There, warriors of the Cuautitlan Kingdom, by orders of King Quinatzin of Cuautitlan, rescued the princess and was brought to safety to Cuautitlan. Cuautitlan was an allied nation of the Aztecs, but were unable to arrive on time to the Battle of Chapultepec, so decided to at least save Chimalxochitl who was geographically closer.

== Religious Service ==
Chimalxochitl was received as a refugee by King Quinatzin but he quickly fell in love with her and even attempted to be physically with her. She vehemently refused any physical relationship with him because she was in the middle her four-year female religious service, which was customary for young women. This religious service required young women to service temples, perform prayers and rituals, and engage in fasting. She explained she had done already two years but had two more years left to fulfill her religious duties.

The Princess asked Quinatzin for a temple to be built for her in order to be able to finish her religious service and afterwards be able to be marry him. Her new temple was erected in a site south of Tequixquinahuac and Huitznahuac. Once the construction was finished, Chimalxochitl was taken there where she finished her remaining two years of female religious service.

Her religious convictions encompassed faith in Tezcatlipoca. The only belongings she had with her when she arrived to Cuautitlan were two objects related to Tezcatlipoca, a mirror and a green blanket. Her belief in Tezcatlipoca was profound that she even named her second son Tezcatltecuhtli in honor of Tezcatlipoca. She was displeased that her husband chose a mundane name for their first-born child, Tlazanotztoc, which she believed he named him like that just because they procreated him in the hunting grounds cottage.

== Queenship ==
After successfully completing her religious service, Chimalxochitl married Quinatzin. She became Queen consort of the Cuautitlan Kingdom.

Political repercussions of this marriage was the enmity and later war against the Xaltocan Kingdom, the nation who was going to execute Chimalxochitl. At the beginning, the people of Cuautitlan grew and demonstrated a hostile sentiment against the people of Xaltocan, in the form of insults and later violence. Name-calling towards men of Xaltocan were tlilhuipillequeh or "those who wear black-colored women's dresses". Later the situation deteriorated to occasional skirmishes with arrows. Cuautitlan broke diplomatic relations with Xaltocan, which gave way to a formal attrition war between Cuautitlan and Xaltocan, which would ultimately destroy Xaltocan.

== Descendancy ==
=== 7 generations descendants of Chimalxochitl ===
1. Tlazanotztoc: Her first-born son. He became High Steward of Tepotzotlan.
  1. Xaltemoctzin of Matlatzinco
  2. Quinatzin
    1. Ihuitltemoctzin
      1. Quinatzin: First King of Tepotzotlan.
        1. Ichpochtzicuiltzin
          1. Don Francisco Carlos Xoconochtzin
        2. Cuauhquece
        3. Nanahuatzin
        4. Petlauhtocatzin
        5. Acatentehuatzin
        6. Aztatzontzin: King of Cuautitlan
          1. Quecehuacatzin
          2. Catlacatzin
          3. Pablo Tlillotlynahual
          4. Techanónoc
          5. Tzipalle
          6. Don Pedro Macuilxochitzin: Rey de Tepotzotlan
            1. Don Diego Nequametzin: Rey de Tepotzotlan
          7. Ayactlacatzin
          8. Don Juan Xaltemoctzin
          9. Don Diego Quinatzin
          10. Lady Tiacapantzin
          11. Lady of Momoztitlan
          12. Unknown female
          13. Unknown female
          14. Unknown female
          15. Unknown female
          16. Unknown male
          17. Unknown male
          18. Unknown male
        7. Totecyatetzin Tocuiltzin
        8. Unknown female
        9. Unknown female
    2. Chahuacuetzin
    3. Cuauhizomoca
    4. Cuecuenotl
  3. A woman of Chimalpan.
2. Tezcatltecuhtli: Her second son, King of Cuautitlan.
3. Teozatzin: Her third son.
4. Tochtzin: Her fourth son.
5. Unknown female, her fifth, a daughter.
