= Coxcoxtli =

King of city-state Culhuacán

- Born: 1270; Tenochtitlan
- Died: 1350 (aged 79); Tenochtitlan
- Spouse: unknown woman
- Issue: King Huehue Acamapichtli; Princess Atotoztli I

Coxcoxtli (modern Nahuatl pronunciation) was a king of city-state Culhuacán.

He had two children — a son called Huehue Acamapichtli and a daughter Atotoztli I, who married Opochtli Iztahuatzin and bore him Acamapichtli, the first ruler of Tenochtitlan. He was thus an ancestor of Aztec emperors.

== Bibliography ==
- Bancroft, Hubert Howe (1876). The Native Races of the Pacific States of North America: Primitive History. Vol. 5. pp. 341–.
- Chimalpahin Cuauhtlehuanitzin, Domingo Francisco de San Antón Muñón (1997). "Mexican History or Chronicle". Codex Chimalpahin: society and politics in Mexico Tenochtitlan, Tlatelolco, Texcoco, Culhuacan, and other Nahua altepetl in central Mexico: the Nahuatl and Spanish annals and accounts collected by don Domingo de San Antón Muñón Chimalpahin Quauhtlehuanitzin. Edited and translated by Arthur J. O. Anderson and Susan Schroeder. Norman: University of Oklahoma Press. pp. 25–177. ISBN 0-8061-2921-2.

Regnal titles
Preceded by Xihuitltemoc	King of Culhuacán ancestor of emperors	Succeeded by Huehue Acamapichtli
