= Diego de San Francisco Tehuetzquititzin =

Don Diego de San Francisco Tehuetzquititzin
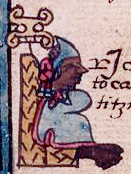

Tlatoani of Tenochtitlan
- Reign: 1541 - 1554
- Predecessor: Diego de Alvarado Huanitzin
- Successor: Cristóbal de Guzmán Cecetzin

Governor of San Juan Tenochtitlan
- In office 1541 - 1554
- Preceded by: Diego de Alvarado Huanitzin
- Succeeded by: Cristóbal de Guzmán Cecetzin
- Died: 1554

Don Diego de San Francisco Tehuetzquititzin (sometimes called Tehuetzquiti or Tehuetzqui) (died 1554) was the 16th tlatoani and second governor of Tenochtitlan.

== Biography ==
According to Chimalpahin, Tehuetzquititzin's father Tezcatl Popocatzin was a son of Tizoc, the seventh ruler of Tenochtitlan.

Tehuetzquititzin became both tlatoani and governor of Tenochtitlan in 1541, after the death of the previous governor, don Diego de Alvarado Huanitzin. In the same year, he participated in the Mixtón War in Nueva Galicia (Nahuatl: Xochipillan), led by viceroy Antonio de Mendoza.

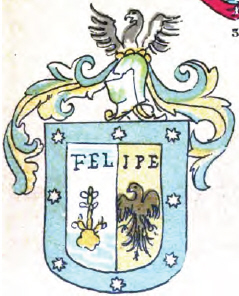
Don Diego's coat of arms.

On 23 December 1546, a cédula was issued by Charles V and his mother Joanna granting don Diego a personal coat of arms in recognition of his service, particularly in the war in Nueva Galicia, and so that "other [Indian] nobles will be inspired to serve us". His arms included the indigenous symbol of Tenochtitlan — a prickly pear cactus growing out of a stone in the middle of a lake — which would centuries later feature in the coat of arms of Mexico, as well as an eagle that may represent Huitzilopochtli.

Tehuetzquititzin died in 1554, having ruled for 14 years. Rather than being immediately replaced by a successor, don Esteban de Guzmán came to Tenochtitlan as juez de residencia. He remained as juez until 1557, when don Cristóbal de Guzmán Cecetzin was installed as ruler.

== Personal life ==
He took as his Christian wife his first cousin, doña María, with whom he had two children, don Alonso Tezcatl Popocatzin and don Pablo (or Pedro) Mauhcaxochitzin, both of whom died young.

By other women he had also had children named don Miguel (or Pablo) Ixcuinantzin (who also died young), don Pedro Xiconocatzin, don José Xaxaqualiuhtocatzin, don Baltasar Ilhuicaxochitzin (who also died young), doña Juana, doña María Tlacoyehuatzin, doña María Francisca, another doña María, and doña Cecilia.

== See also ==
- List of Tenochtitlan rulers

== Notes ==
Regnal titles
Preceded by Diego de Alvarado Huanitzin	Tlatoani of Tenochtitlan; 1541–1554	Vacant Juicio de residencia Title next held by Cristóbal de Guzmán Cecetzin
Political offices
Preceded by Diego de Alvarado Huanitzin	Governor of San Juan Tenochtitlan; 1541 – 1554	Succeeded by Cristóbal de Guzmán Cecetzin
