= Atotoztli =

Atotoztli may refer to:

- Atotoztli I, 13th and/or 14th century Toltec princess of Culhuacan and queen consort of Coatlinchan
- Atotoztli II (fl. 1466–1472, daughter of the Aztec emperor Moctezuma I and Chichimecacihuatzin I
