= Huehue Acamapichtli =

King of Culhuacán

Huehue Acamapichtli (Ācamāpichtli [aːkamaːˈpit͡ʃt͡ɬi] = "Handful of reeds", modern Nahuatl pronunciation) was a king (Nahuatl: tlatoani) of Culhuacán.

He was a son — and successor — of King Coxcoxtli and his wife.

His sister was Atotoztli I of Culhuacán — mother of tlatoani of Tenochtitlan, named also Acamapichtli.

Diego Durán, Fernando Alvarado Tezozómoc and Fernando de Alva Cortés Ixtlilxochitl mentioned that Huehue Acamapichtli occupied the throne of Culhuacán in 1324.

== Sources ==
Regnal titles
Preceded by Coxcoxtli	King of Culhuacán	Succeeded by ?
