= Francisco Jiménez (governor) =

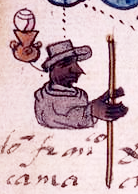
- Jiménez in the Aubin Codex

Judge-governor of Tenochtitlan
- In office 1568–1569
- Preceded by: Luis de Santa María Nanacacipactzin (as Tlatoani and Governor)
- Succeeded by: Antonio Valeriano

Francisco Jiménez was a colonial Nahua noble from Tecamachalco. He served as judge-governor of Tenochtitlan for a year and five months in 1568 and 1569, and was the first outsider to govern Tenochtitlan. Despite being a noble, the use of the honorific don with his name is inconsistent.

== See also ==
- List of Tenochtitlan rulers

== Notes ==
Political offices
Vacant Title last held by Luis de Santa María Nanacacipactzin as tlatoani and governor	Judge-governor of Tenochtitlan; 1568–1569	Vacant Title next held by Antonio Valeriano
