= Quatlecoatl =

- Prince of Tenochtitlan
- Spouse: unknown
- Father: Emperor Acamapichtli
- Mother: Queen Xiuhcuetzin

Quatlecoatl was an Aztec prince, son of Emperor Acamapichtli and Queen Xiuhcuetzin, half-brother of Emperors Huitzilihuitl and Itzcoatl, an uncle of Chimalpopoca and Moctezuma I.

Chimalpahin mentions this prince in his work:

"By Ahatl's daughter [was born] another son, who was named Quatlecoatl, from whom issued and descended the head men of Mexico... captains and soldiers."

== Sources ==
- Chimalpahin Cuauhtlehuanitzin, Domingo Francisco de San Antón Muñón (1997). "Mexican History or Chronicle". Codex Chimalpahin: society and politics in Mexico Tenochtitlan, Tlatelolco, Texcoco, Culhuacan, and other Nahua altepetl in central Mexico: the Nahuatl and Spanish annals and accounts collected by don Domingo de San Antón Muñón Chimalpahin Quauhtlehuanitzin. Edited and translated by Arthur J. O. Anderson and Susan Schroeder. Norman: University of Oklahoma Press. pp. 25–177. ISBN 0-8061-2921-2.
