= Antonio Valeriano =

Nahua writer, Mexican governor

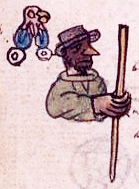
- Valeriano depicted in the Aubin Codex.

Judge-governor of San Juan Tenochtitlan
- In office 1573–1599
- Preceded by: Francisco Jiménez
- Succeeded by: Gerónimo López

Judge-governor of Azcapotzalco
- In office 1565–?

Personal details
- Born: ca. 1521 Azcapotzalco
- Died: 1605

Antonio Valeriano (c. 1521–1605) was a colonial Mexican, Nahua scholar and politician. He was a collaborator with fray Bernardino de Sahagún in the creation of the twelve-volume General History of the Things of New Spain, the Florentine Codex, He served as judge-governor of both his home, Azcapotzalco, and of Tenochtitlan, in Spanish colonial New Spain.

== Career ==
Antonio de Valeriano was the most accomplished pupil and then native scholar at the Franciscan Colegio de Santa Cruz de Tlatelolco. As with other students at the colegio, Valeriano was taught literacy in Nahuatl, Spanish, and Latin. Bernardino de Sahagún singled out Valeriano as "one of my collaborators ... collegians expert in grammar. The principal and most learned of them was Antonio de Valeriano of Atzcapoltzalco." He was also praised by Franciscan Fray Juan Bautista, who preserved the last letter that Valeriano wrote him in Latin. Valeriano says that "my hands are trembling, my eyes are clouded, and my ears closed" (manus namque vacillant, oculi calignant, et aures occlusae) and signing as "Your most loving, but unworthy, Antonius Valerianus" Tui amantissimus etsi indignus. Antonius Valerianus).

Valeriano and other pupils and former pupils of the colegio are to be credited with their collaboration with the Franciscans in creating religious texts, dictionaries, and other texts such as Sahagún's magnum opus of the General History of the Things of New Spain, the Florentine Codex.

== Position in Tenochtitlan ==
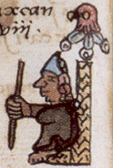
Another depiction of Valeriano in the Aubin Codex, with tlatoani-like attire

Valeriano served as judge-governor of San Juan Tenochtitlan, the former capital of the Aztec Empire, from 1573 to 1599. The city had only recently begun to be ruled by non-dynastic governors, its governors often having been descendants of the old Aztec emperors until the death of Luis de Santa María Nanacacipactzin in 1565. These dynastic governors used the old royal title tlatoani; beginning with Valeriano's predecessor Francisco Jiménez, governors of the city were simply called juez-gobernador. Though not noble himself, Valeriano was of Nahua origin and was connected to the previous royal dynasty through marrying a daughter of the tlatoani and governor Diego de Alvarado Huanitzin.

As judge-governor, Valeriano operated between two worlds; he spoke both Spanish and Nahuatl and served as both a preserver and destroyer of the pre-colonial culture. He dressed as a Spaniard, but artistic depictions of him varied. Some depicted him the same as the other judge-governors. It also appears that some in Tenochtitlan saw Valeriano as almost a tlatoani, since he in one depiction in the Aubin Codex is shown with a crown and seated on a throne. The depiction differs from how the same codex depicts the tlatoani however, in that he is shown with a brown Spanish shirt rather than Nahua attire and that he is holding a staff of justice (symbolizing his role as judge).

== Question of authorship of the Nican Mopohua ==
The question of Valeriano's authorship of the Nahuatl text known as Nican Mopohua has become a point of contention in the long-running dispute over the historicity of the apparitions of the Virgin Mary (under the title Our Lady of Guadalupe) to Juan Diego in 1531. The Nican Mopohua was published in 1649 by Luis Laso de la Vega as part of a composite text known from its opening words as the Huei tlamahuiçoltica, and de la Vega's claims of authorship in the preface to that work notwithstanding, the Nican Mopohua has long been attributed to Valeriano. This attribution is based on a tradition dating back to the Informaciones Jurídicas de 1666 and the assertions of Luis Becerra Tanco and, subsequently, Don Carlos de Sigüenza y Góngora as to Valeriano's authorship and as to their acquaintance with the relative manuscripts in his hand-writing.

Suggestions have been made that its content is incompatible with someone (such as Valeriano) who had close bonds with the Franciscans, and others have suggested that the Huei tlamahuiçoltica is a unitary work which – despite the considerable objections against such a possibility – de la Vega wrote, with the assistance of a collaborator. Nevertheless, the general consensus among Mexican scholars (ecclesiastical and secular) remains that Valeriano is indeed the author of the Nican Mopohua.

== See also ==
- Crónica Mexicayotl
- Fernando Alvarado Tezozómoc

== Notes ==
=== References ===
- Brading, D. A. (2001). Mexican Phoenix: Our Lady of Guadalupe: Image and Tradition Across Five Centuries. Cambridge: Cambridge University Press. ISBN 0-521-80131-1. OCLC 44868981.
- Castañeda de la Paz, María, "Historia de una casa real. Origen y ocaso del linaje gobernante en México-Tenochtitlan", Nuevo Mundo Mundos Nuevos [online]. Article online since 31 January 2011, accessed 21 December 2013
- Karttunen, Frances (1995). "From Courtyard to the Seat of Government: The Career of Antonio Valeriano, Nahua Colleague of Bernardino de Sahagún". Amerindia. 19/20: 113–120. Archived from the original on 2011-07-18.
- Ricard, Robert. The Spiritual Conquest of Mexico: An Essay on the Apostolate and the Evangelizing Methods of the Mendicant Orders in New Spain, 1523-1572. Translated by Lesley Byrd Simpson. Berkeley: University of California Press 1966. Originally published in French in 1933..
- Sousa Lisa, Stafford Poole and James Lockhart (edd. and trans.) (1998). The Story of Guadalupe (Nahuatl Studies Series, Number 5). Stanford CA: Stanford University Press.
- Traslosheros, Jorge E. (2009). "Guadalupan Voices in the History of Mexico" presentation to Marian Congress 6–8 August 2009 Phoenix, Arizona, accessed 2011-02-02

Political offices
Preceded by ?	Judge-governor of Azcapotzalco; 1565 – ?	Succeeded by ?
Preceded by Francisco Jiménez	Judge-governor of Mexico Tenochtitlan; 1573–1599	Succeeded by Gerónimo López
