= Huehue Huitzilihuitl =

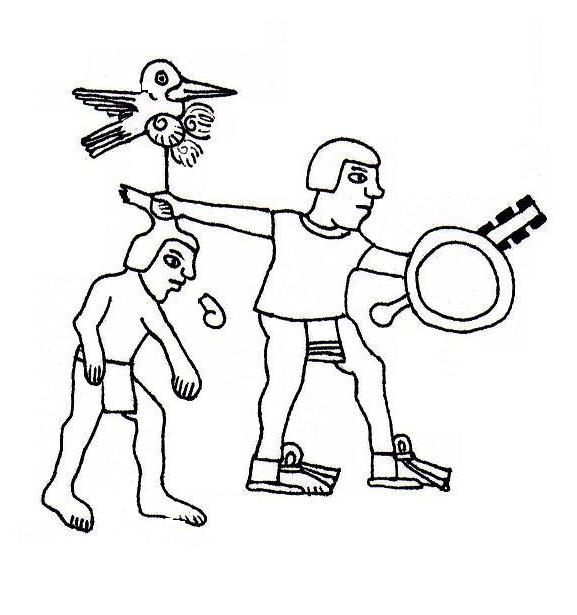
From Codex Boturini

Huehue Huitzilihuitl (1227–1299) ("Huitzilihuitl the Elder", to distinguish him from Huitzilihuitl who ruled Tenochtitlan) was the tlatoani ("ruler" or "king") of the Aztec while they were settled at Chapultepec in the 13th century (1272–1299).

When the Mexica were attacked and driven from Chapultepec, Huehue Huitzilihuitl was captured and brought to Culhuacan next to his daughter where they were executed. The sole survivor of the Aztec royal family was Chimalxochitl, another daughter of Huitzilihuitl. The Mexica would not again be ruled by a tlatoani until after their settlement at Tenochtitlan, where they took Acamapichtli as their leader.

== See also ==
Chimalxochitl II - Daughter of Huitzilihuitl, Princess of the Aztecs and Queen of Cuautitlan
