= Matlalxoch =

- Princess of Tenochtitlan
- Father: Emperor Acamapichtli

Matlalxoch was an Aztec princess who was the only daughter of Emperor Acamapichtli. She was a half-sister of Emperors Huitzilihuitl and Itzcoatl and half-aunt of Emperors Chimalpopoca and Moctezuma I. She is mentioned by Chimalpahin.

== Sources ==
- Chimalpahin Cuauhtlehuanitzin, Domingo Francisco de San Antón Muñón (1997). "Mexican History or Chronicle". Codex Chimalpahin: society and politics in Mexico Tenochtitlan, Tlatelolco, Texcoco, Culhuacan, and other Nahua altepetl in central Mexico: the Nahuatl and Spanish annals and accounts collected by don Domingo de San Antón Muñón Chimalpahin Quauhtlehuanitzin. Edited and translated by Arthur J. O. Anderson and Susan Schroeder. Norman: University of Oklahoma Press. pp. 25–177. ISBN 0-8061-2921-2.
