= Quecholcohuatl =

Chalcan musician

- Born: Chalco or Tenochtitlan, Mexico
- Other name: Don Jerónimo
- Occupation: Musician
- Years active: Late 1400s – early 1500s

Quecholcohuatl was a Chalcan musician. He was known for making peace between his native altepetl of Chalco and Tenochtitlan by serenading its tlatoani, Axayacatl, in 1479.

His song became a multigenerational hit and brought fame to his hometown of Amaquemecan. Chimalpahin, a Nahua annalist, commented that, "Because of it Amaquemecan (Ah-mah-kay-MAY-kahn) was [once] famous, an altepetl which now appears small and unimportant".

His Nahuatl name roughly translated to "Flamingo Snake" in English, although he later adopted the Christian name Don Jerónimo, after the Spanish conquest of the Aztec Empire of 1519–21.

== Making peace ==
The story of how Quecholcohuatl made peace with the tlatoani of Tenochtitlan, Axayacatl, is told in the Eight Relations, an annal written by Chalcan annalist Chimalpahin. The story features in his Seventh Relation.

Chalco was conquered by the Aztec triple-alliance under Moctezuma I in or around 1465, after which the kings of Chalco were exiled to Huexotzinco. By 1479, the Chalcan people had grown tired of the hegemonic dominion of the Aztecs and wanted to join the Mexica of Tenochtitlan, Tepanecs of Tlacopan, and the Acolhua of Texcoco as an allied power in the Valley of Mexico. In order to achieve this, Quecholcohuatl travelled to Tenochtitlan in 1479, accompanied by other Chalcan drummers and singers, to perform for the tlatoani, Axayacatl. Quecholcohuatl was not supposed to be the lead musician, but the chosen Chalcan nobleman had fainted earlier that day, leaving Quecholcohuatl to lead the performance. The Mexica believed that the musicians came for the sole purpose of entertaining the tlatoani, however, the performance carried a political message. The song title performed by the group of Chalcans roughly translates to "the Chalca woman's song". It is sung from the perspective of a Chalcan noblewoman taken prisoner during the war with the Aztecs. The song highlighted how the Aztecs' hegemony had disproportionately devastated Chalcan women. Women were seen as relatively equal to men during times of peace but were condemned to sexual slavery by the victors, a sanction that passed onto her children. The girl's reaction to her situation evolves; she initially attempts to regain agency by flirting with her master: "What if I were to pleasure him?". In later stanzas, she offers more direct references to how the master sexually exploits her:

Will you ruin my body painting?
You will lie watching what comes to be a green flamingo bird flower...
It is a quetzal popcorn flower, a flamingo raven flower.
You lie on your flower-mantled mat.
It lies inside.
You lie on your golden reed mat.
It lies in the feathered cavern house.

Later in the song, the Chalcan woman's heart breaks as she remembers her life before the desolation of war and hegemony. She remembers that, as the children of a noblewoman, her offspring were to be rulers, something that she laments losing:

As a noble girl child, I was spoken of in connection with my marriage...
It is infuriating, it is heartrending, here on Earth.
I worry and fret.
I consume myself in rage.
In my desperation, I suddenly say, "hey, child, I would as soon die

The line, "I would as soon die" (Classical Nahuatl: Manoce nimiqui), is intended to emphasize her despair upon losing any hope of raising influential children. The song ends with the Chalcan girl offering to live with the tlatoani without rancor, if and only if she were treated with respect:

Don't let your heart take a needless tumble...
Here is your hand.
Come along, holding me by the hand.
Be content.
On your reed mat, on your throne, sleep peacefully.
Relax, you who are kind Axayacatl.

At this point in the performance, the tlatoani came out from inside, where he was accompanied by his women, to dance, something that was considered a great honor for the performers. Once the music finished, the tlatoani retired inside, sending a messenger to summon the lead musician. When Quecholcohuatl entered, he began to beg forgiveness of the tlatoani. However, it turned out that Axayacatl actually enjoyed the performance. He took Quecholcohuatl to bed with him and requested that he only perform for him thereafter. Chimalpahin reported that Axayacatl told his wives: "Women, stand up and meet him, seat him among you. Here has come your rival." Therefore, it is believed that Quecholcohuatl and Axayacatl engaged in sexual relations that afternoon before a great feast. Axayacatl died two years later in 1481. His successor and eldest half-brother, Tizoc, completed the process of reinstating the royal lines and tlatoque of Chalco in 1486.
