= Francisco Benítez Ynga =

Governor of San Juan Tenochtitlan
- In office 1659–1661
- Preceded by: Pedro Bernal
- Succeeded by: Lorenzo de Santiago

Personal details
- Born: 1617
- Died: Unknown
- Occupation: Politician

Francisco Benítez Ynga (1617) was an indigenous nobleman and politician of the Spanish Empire. A grand-grandson of Emperor Atahualpa, he moved from Peru to New Spain in his youth and built a successful political career in the former Aztec Empire, eventually becoming the main indigenous governor of Ciudad de México in 1659 despite lacking the required Nahua blood.

== Biography ==
He was the son of Bartolomé Ynga (or Inca), from Lima, and Luisa Ismaquibo, from Trujillo. His father was a mestizo, the son of Ana Azarpacoya, granddaughter of Atahualpa, and conquistador José de Orozco y Gamarra, who hailed from Toledo. At the age of thirteen or fourteen, Francisco sailed from El Callao to New Spain with Captain Alonso Prieto, arriving in 1630. There, he connected with another expatriate Inca nobleman, Juan García Bravo de Laguna Aguilar Inca, and married his relative Antonia de Mendoza; she was, in turn, a kinswoman of the nobleman Diego de Mendoza Austria y Moctezuma, who dubiously claimed descent from the emperor Moctezuma. In 1645, he became governor of the newly established cabildo of Santa María de La Asunción Milpa Alta in Xochimilco, and by 1652, he was serving as governor of Xochimilco itself, with the support of local native electors. Notably, Benítez climbed to these jobs without even being fluent in Nahuatl.

In January 1659, at the peak of his political career, he ran for the office of indigenous governor of San Juan Tenochtitlan, an election that became highly unusual in the history of the viceroyalty. Not only was there no candidate from the Tenochca royal line, but the Nahua council had deliberately allowed two outsiders to run: Benítez, a Peruvian native, and Juan López, an influential peninsular with a native wife. Theoretically this was impossible, as mestizos, peninsulares and mulattos were barred from holding native offices since at least the royal decree of August 23, 1642 (though there was a certain tradition of allowing mestizos in the job, a departure from the rule that Spanish authorities permitted if the candidates demonstrated their suitability). Against all odds, Benítez won by a wide margin, securing 81 out of 132 votes, while López also scored higher than expected with 36.

The third candidate, purblood native Lorenzo de Santiago, who had received 21 votes, attempted to have Benítez disqualified by the viceregal authorities, accusing him of being both Inca and mestizo. It was found that hile the ordinances restricted candidacy to natives, they did not specify a particular ethnicity, so Santiago's representative focused on accusing Benítez of having mixed-race ancestry, which would render him surely ineligible for the office. It is also possible that Santiago did not wish to draw attention to the fact that he himself was not an ethnically perfect candidate, given that his lineage was Tlatelolca rather than Tenochca. Nevertheless, oidor Andrés Sánchez de Ocampo and the rest of the Real Audiencia ruled in Benítez's favor; they decided against investigating the Inca's purity of blood due to the cumbersome nature of the process, concluding instead that his decisive electoral victory was sufficient proof of his qualification. Viceroy Francisco Fernández de la Cueva subsequently ratified his appointment.

Benítez appears to have had a successful term, as he was re-elected in the 1660-1661 term. His career proceeded uneventfully until 1672, when a group of councilmen, and citizens of San Juan Tenochtitlan filed a complaint against him, accusing him of tyranny during his mandates. This conflict likely stemmed from rivalries regarding religious jurisdictions, as Benítez hailed from a district administered by Franciscans, whereas his accusers came from districts under Augustinian supervision. That year, he ran for governor again, but the position went to Juan de Aguilar, a Nahua nobleman whom Benítez himself, ironically, accused of having Spanish blood. The date of Benítez's death is unknown, though he was still alive in 1678 and made one final, unsuccessful bid for office.

== Bibliography ==
- Connell, William F. (2012). After Moctezuma: Indigenous Politics and Self-Government in Mexico City, 1524–1730. University of Oklahoma Press. ISBN 9780806185439.
- De la Puente Luna, José Carlos (2018). Andean Cosmopolitans: Seeking Justice and Reward at the Spanish Royal Court. University of Texas Press. ISBN 9781477314883.
- Rovira Morgado, R. (2017) "Forjadores del orbe indiano: tres generaciones de Incas en la Nueva España (c. 1563-1672)". Cuadernos Americanos 161 (México, 2017/3), pp. 137-153.
