= Juan Velázquez Tlacotzin =

Aztec noble and Cihuacoatl

Tlacotzin
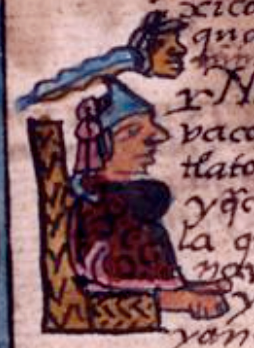
- Tlacotzin in the Aubin Codex

Tlatoani of Tenochtitlan
- Reign: 1525–1526
- Predecessor: Hernando de Alvarado Cuauhtémoc
- Successor: Andrés de Tapia Motelchiuh
- Died: 1526

Tlacotzin was an Aztec leader in Tenochtitlan, during the final decades of the Aztec Empire. After converting to Christianity as Juan Velázquez Tlacotzin, he was the first post-Spanish conquest indigenous ruler of Tenochtitlan from 1525 to 1526. Although little noted in historiography, he played a privileged role in the first years of the Spanish rule.

== Biography ==
=== Conquest of the Aztec Empire ===
He was a grandson to Tlacaelel, and like him he became a cihuacoatl or counselor, serving Moctezuma II and of Cuauhtémoc. Tlacotzin was Cuahtémoc's general during the siege of Tenochtitlan, during whose course he acted as a key negotiator between the increasingly troubled Aztecs and Hernán Cortés.

After the capture of Cuauhtémoc and the fall of the city, Tlacotzin became a trusted man for Cortés and was appointed ruler of Moyotlan, the biggest of the four districts of Tenochtitlan (currently Barrio de San Juan in Mexico City). He converted to Christianity under the name of Juan Velázquez Tlacotzin, as recorded in the Crónica Mexicayotl. Under his new role, he managed the works of reconstruction of Tenochtitlan, now known as Ciudad de México, arranging for the new city's first tianguis to be built near his own residence. His new properties gave him important economic benefits.

=== Expedition to Hibueras ===
He was brought along with Cuauhtémoc and several other Mexica noblemen in Cortés' expedition to the Hibueras (current Honduras) in 1524, as the conquistador wanted to have the old Aztec guard with him to prevent possible rebellions. Due to the difficult course of the expedition, the Aztec auxiliares entertained to revolt, killing the Spaniards and return home, but Tlacotzin and fellow nobleman Andrés de Tapia Motelchiuh found out about it and warned Cortés. Tlacotzin's high position meant he had much to win by disposing of Cuauhtémoc. As a consequence, Cortés executed Cuauhtémoc and awarded Tlacotzin by choosing him Cuauhtémoc's successor as a huey tlatoani, planning to permanently install him in México. Cortés honored Tlacotzin by gifting him Spanish weapons and a white horse.

He never got to rule his city, as he died in 1526 (8 Tochtli) while in the expedition, of an unknown sickness in Nochixtlan. Although Tlacotzin was to govern like a tlatoani, his non-noble birth (and lack of connection to the previous royal dynasty) as well as him not going through the traditional investiture ceremony meant that he was regarded by the Nahua subjects as cuauhtlatoani ("eagle ruler"; a non-dynastic interim ruler) instead. Cortés then chose Motelchiuh as his successor.

== See also ==
- List of Tenochtitlan rulers
- Aztec emperors family tree
- Spanish conquest of the Aztec Empire

== Bibliography ==
- Gibson, Charles (1978). Los aztecas bajo el dominio español (1519-1810). Siglo Veintiuno. ISBN 9789682301445.
- Mundy, Barbara E. (2018). La muerte de Tenochtitlan, la vida de México. Grano de Sal. ISBN 9786079773298.

| Preceded by Matlatzincatzin | Cihuacoatl; 1520–1525 | Succeeded by Office abolished |
| Preceded by Cuauhtemoc (as tlatoani) | Cuauhtlatoani of Tenochtitlan; 1525–1526 | Succeeded by Andrés de Tapia Motelchiuh |
