= Pablo Xochiquentzin =

Mexican politician

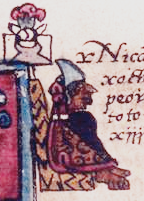
Xochiquentzin in the Aubin Codex

Don Pablo Xochiquentzin (died 1536) was a ruler of the Aztecs.

Like his predecessor, Andrés de Tapia Motelchiuh, he was not of the upper class, so he was not designated a tlatoani, but rather a cuauhtlatoani ("eagle ruler"; a non-dynastic interim ruler). Even so, he was considered a successor to the tlatoques, or rulers.

Xochiquetzin was acquainted with Martín Ocelotl, a prominent Aztec who would be involved in a famous prosecution by the newly founded Inquisition of Mexico. Ocelotl was the main target of Bishop Juan de Zumárraga, but was spared until the death of Xochiquetzin.

Xochiquetzin died in 1536 after ruling for five years. After his death the Spanish escalated their efforts to fight against paganism and the influence of the native upper classes.

== See also ==
- List of Tenochtitlan rulers

Preceded by Andrés de Tapia Motelchiuh	Cuauhtlatoani of Tenochtitlan; 1530–1536	Succeeded by Diego Huanitzin (as tlatoani)
