= Cristóbal de Guzmán Cecetzin =

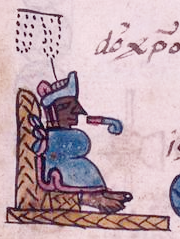
- Cecetzin with his name glyph.

Tlatoani of Tenochtitlan
- Reign: 1557 - 1562
- Predecessor: Diego de San Francisco Tehuetzquititzin
- Successor: Luis de Santa María Nanacacipactzin

Governor of San Juan Tenochtitlan
- In office 1557 – 1562
- Preceded by: Diego de San Francisco Tehuetzquititzin
- Succeeded by: Luis de Santa María Nanacacipactzin

Alcalde of San Juan Tenochtitlan
- In office 1556; Served with Miguel Sánchez Yscatl
- Preceded by: Alonso de San Miguel and Miguel Díaz
- Succeeded by: Tomás de Aquino Yspopulac and Luis de Santa María Nanacacipactzin
- Died: 1562
- Father: Diego Huanitzin

Don Cristóbal de Guzmán Cecetzin (or Cecepaticatzin) was a colonial Nahua noble from Santa María Cuepopan in San Juan Tenochtitlan. A son of the ruler don Diego Huanitzin, don Cristóbal first served as alcalde in 1556 before becoming Tenochtitlan's next-to-last tlatoani and third governor in 1557, titles he held until his death in 1562.

== See also ==
- List of Tenochtitlan rulers

Regnal titles
Vacant Title last held by Diego de San Francisco Tehuetzquititzin	Tlatoani of Tenochtitlan; 1557–1562	Succeeded by Luis de Santa María Nanacacipactzin
Political offices
Vacant Title last held by Diego de San Francisco Tehuetzquititzin	Governor of San Juan Tenochtitlan; 1557–1562	Succeeded by Luis de Santa María Nanacacipactzin
Preceded by Alonso de San Miguel and Miguel Díaz	Alcalde of San Juan Tenochtitlan; 1556 with Miguel Sánchez Yscatl	Succeeded by Tomás de Aquino Yspopulac and Luis de Santa María Nanacacipactzin
