= Cuautitlán =

- Town & Municipality
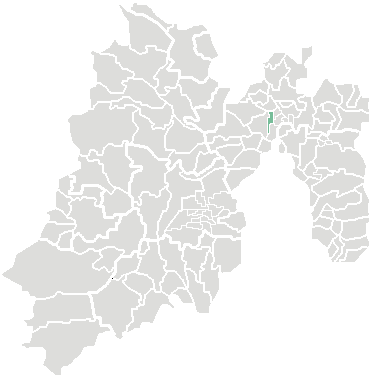
- Ubicación de Cuautitlán

- Location within Mexico
- Coordinates: 19°40′20″N 99°10′50″W
- Country: Mexico
- State: State of Mexico
- Municipal Status: 1861

Government
  - Municipal President: Aldo Ledezma Reyna (2022–2024)

Area
  - Municipality: 40.9 km^{2} (15.8 sq mi)
- Elevation (of seat): 2,250 m (7,380 ft)

Population (2020)
  - Municipality: 178,847
  - Density: 4,376.8/km^{2} (11,336/sq mi)
  - Seat: 97,686
- Time zone: UTC-6 (CST)
- Postal code (of seat): 54800
- Area code: 55
- Demonym: Cuautitlense
- Website: http://www.cuautitlan.gob.mx
- Also sometimes called Cuautitlán de Romero Rubio after a former administrative division, to better differentiate it from Cuautitlán Izcalli.

Cuautitlán (Nahuatl pronunciation: [kwautiˈtɬan], Otomi: Nza), is a municipality in the State of Mexico, just north of the northern tip of the Federal District (Distrito Federal) within the Greater Mexico City urban area. The city of Cuautitlán is the municipal seat and makes up most of the municipality. The name comes from Nahuatl and means 'between the trees.'

== City and municipal seat ==
In the Mexican national census of 2020, the municipality recorded an overall population of 178,847. The great majority of these inhabitants — some 117,995 people — resided in the urban confines of the city of Cuautitlán itself.

=== History ===
Cuautitlán as an urban center began in the mid-14th century, though its general area had long been settled before that. It was settled by Chichimec, who worshipping Mixcoatl and Itzpapalotl and had hostile relations with Xaltocan and the Tepanec. It later received refugees from Colhuacan and Xaltocan, who introduced a Toltec culture including the festival of Izcalli and the cult of Toci, 9 Monkey and Xochiquetzal. It was under Azcapotzalco before being conquered by the Triple Alliance in 1435 under Itzcoatl, whereafter it became a province under the domain of Tlacopan, divided into four further sub-provinces. The language in Cuautitlan was Nahuatl.

After the Conquest, Cuautitlán was evangelized by the Franciscans. They constructed San Buenaventura monastery and established the brotherhood of the Purísima Concepción de Nuestra Señora de Cuautitlán. Saint Juan Diego (1474–1548) reputedly lived there with his wife Maria Lucia up to the time of her death in 1529. They lived there in a one-roomed mud house thatched with corn stalks. The house still survives in a good state of preservation. Cuautitlán gained city status in 1968.

It is the birthplace of painter and sculptor Luis Nishizawa (1918–2014).

== The municipality ==
As municipal seat, Cuautitlán has governing jurisdiction over the following communities: Colonia Venecia, Ejido de Santa Bárbara, Ex-hacienda la Corregidora (La Corregidora), Fracción San Roque (El Prieto), Granja San Isidro, Hacienda San Mateo, La Chinampa, La Laguna, La Trinidad, Machero, Rancho Puente la Cruz, San Mateo Ixtacalco, Santa María Huecatitla, and Xaltipa (Jaltipa).

The municipality has an area of 40.9 km^{2} (15.8 sq mi).

== Notable people ==
Chimalxochitl II - Queen consort of the Cuautitlan Kingdom

Luis Nishizawa - Painter and sculptor
