= La Libertad, Amazonas =

Coordinates: 3.9496°S 70.1678°W

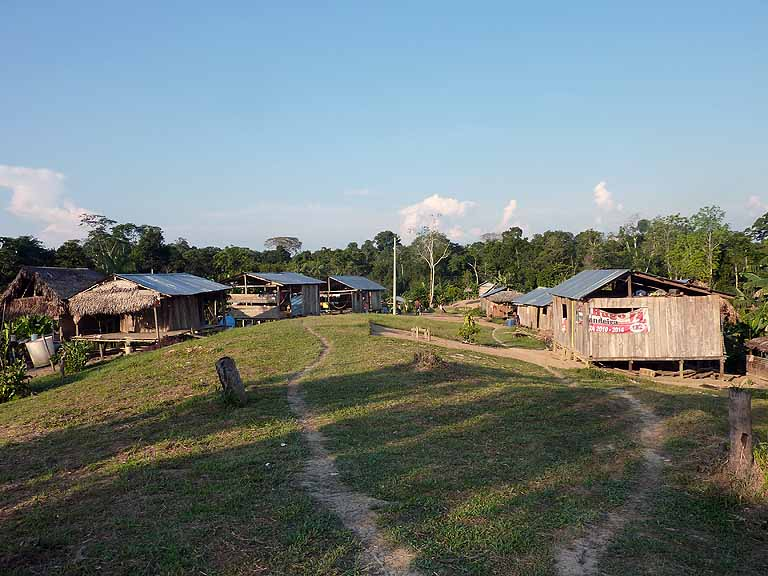

La Libertad, also recorded as Comunidad Indígena La Libertad, is a populated center of Colombia of the Yagua people located on the banks of the Amazon River, in Colombia, South America. It is within the province of the Amazonas. It is located 39 kilometres (24 mi) northwest of the city of Leticia, Colombia.

== History ==
According to the village shaman Gustavo Cadenas, the first people (about 50) arrived in the settlement during 1992. Twenty years later the village numbered about 350 people, the majority being under the age of 18. At the 2018 census, the population was 313, with around half being under 20.

== Economy ==
All established families have their own areas of cultivation, growing mostly bananas, plantain, yucca, and other assorted tropical fruits. They also rely on fish for a staple food. The work of the villagers deals mostly with tourism, some guided, and handicrafts sold to tourists or to retailers in the city of Leticia.
