= Andrés de Tapia Motelchiuh =

Mexican politician

Motelchiuhtzin
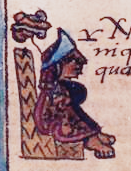
- Motelchiuhtzin in the Aubin Codex
- Born: Don Andrés de Tapia Motelchiuh Huitznahuatlailótlac
- Years active: 1525–1530
- Known for: Ruler of Tenochtitlan

Don Andrés de Tapia Motelchiuh Huitznahuatlailótlac, also known as Motelchiuhtzin, was the ruler of Tenochtitlan (1525–1530).

After the death of Don Juan Velázquez Tlacotzin in Nochixtlan in 1525, Hernán Cortés chose Don Andrés Motelchiuhtzin as the new ruler of Tenochtitlan.

Motelchiuhtzin was not of the upper classes; he was born as a "macehualli" or working commoner, but he had gained renown as a warrior captain. He was captured together with Cuauhtémoc, and tortured along with him to reveal the location of the Aztecs' gold. Eventually he was freed and he returned to his lands.

Because Tenochtitlan was in ruins, he stayed in Nochixtlan. In the three years of Cortés expeditions, he had been ruling Tenochtitlan as cuauhtlatoani. He would not be tlatoani, but he would stayed as cuauhtlatoani two years more.

During his rule, the Aztec titles and decorations were suppressed by the Spanish rulers.

In 1530, Motelchiuhtzin went with the Spaniards to an expedition to Teocolhuacan, against the Chichimeca and in Aztatlan was wounded by a Chichimecan arrow while he was bathing, and died of the wound. He left a son called Hernando de Tapia.

(Bowditch 1904) identifies this person simply as Motelchiuh, and says he was named for "his godfather, Don Andrés de Tapia Motelchiuh". This presumably refers to the Spanish conquistador Don Andrés de Tapia, and probably should read "his godfather, Don Andrés de Tapia".

== See also ==
- List of Tenochtitlan rulers

Preceded by Diego Velázquez Tlacotzin	Cuauhtlatoani of Tenochtitlan; 1525–1530	Succeeded by Pablo Xochiquentzin
