= Leticia, Amazonas =

Place in Department of Amazonas, Colombia

Leticia
- Municipality and town
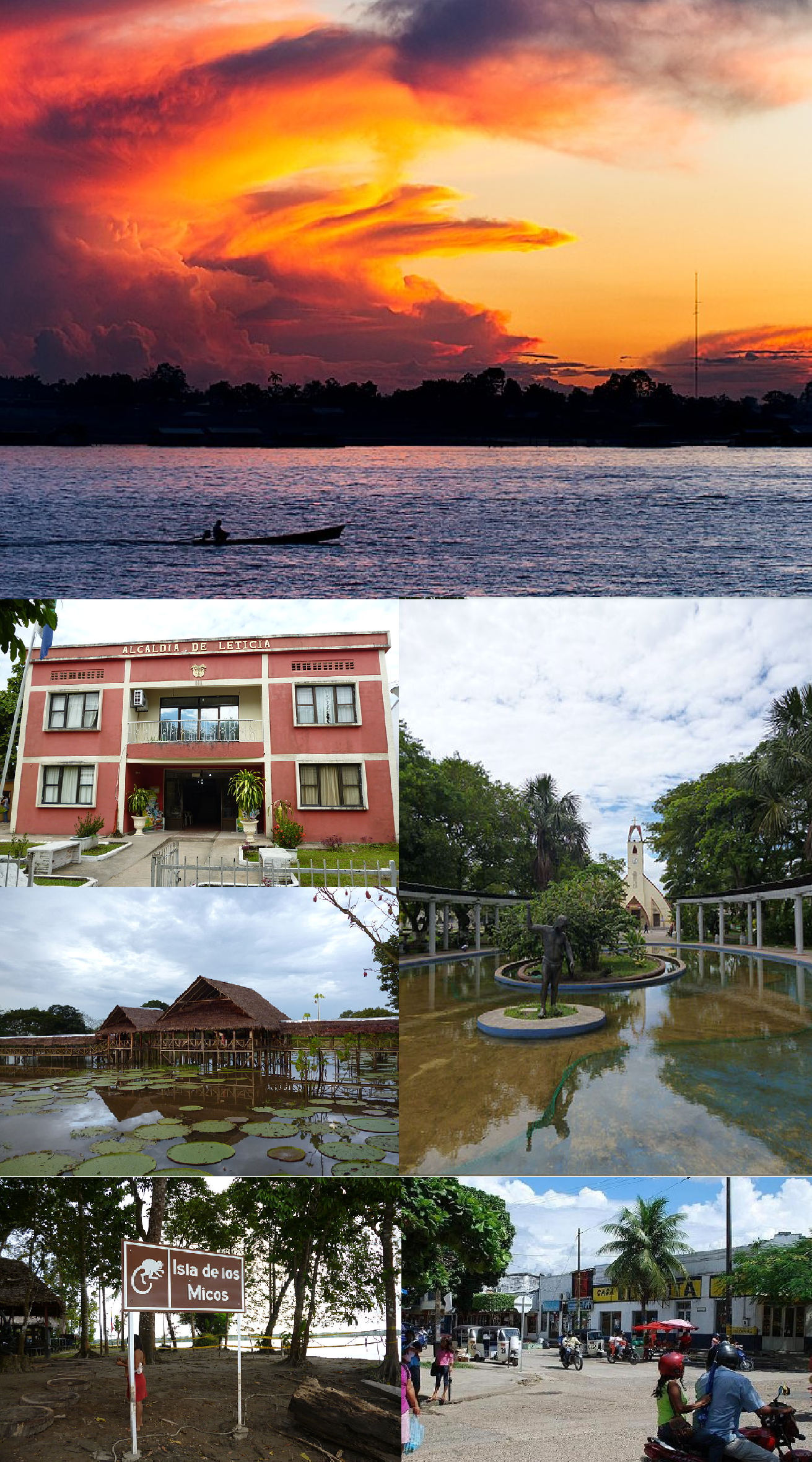
- (Clockwise from the top): Sunset in the Amazonas River, Santander Park with the Cathedral of Leticia in the background, downtown Leticia (near the border between Colombia and Brazil), Los Micos River Island, Victoria Regia lotus garden, Leticia City Hall (Alcaldía de Leticia)

- Flag Coat of arms

- Location map of the municipality and town of Leticia in the Department of Amazonas.

- Location in Colombia
- Coordinates: 4°12′19″S 69°55′58″W
- Country: Colombia
- Department: Amazonas
- Foundation: 1867

Government
  - Mayor: Jorge Luis Mendoza

Area
  - Municipality and town: 6,182 km^{2} (2,387 sq mi)
  - Urban: 13.05 km^{2} (5.04 sq mi)
- Elevation: 96 m (315 ft)

Population (2018)
  - Municipality and town: 48,144
  - Density: 7.788/km^{2} (20.17/sq mi)
  - Urban: 33,503
  - Urban density: 2,567/km^{2} (6,649/sq mi)
- Demonym: Leticiano
- Time zone: UTC-5
- Area code: 57 + 8
- Climate: Af
- Website: Official website

Leticia (Spanish pronunciation: [leˈtisja]) is the southernmost city in the Republic of Colombia, capital of the department of Amazonas, Colombia's southernmost town (4.09° south 69.57° west) and one of the major ports on the Amazon River. It has an elevation of 96 meters (315') above sea level and an average temperature of 27 °C (80.6 °F). Leticia has long been Colombia's shipping point for tropical fish for the aquarium trade. Leticia has a population of 33,503 located on the left bank of the Amazon River at the point where the borders of Colombia, Brazil and Peru meet in an area called Tres Fronteras. It is the largest Colombian settlement in the Southern Hemisphere.

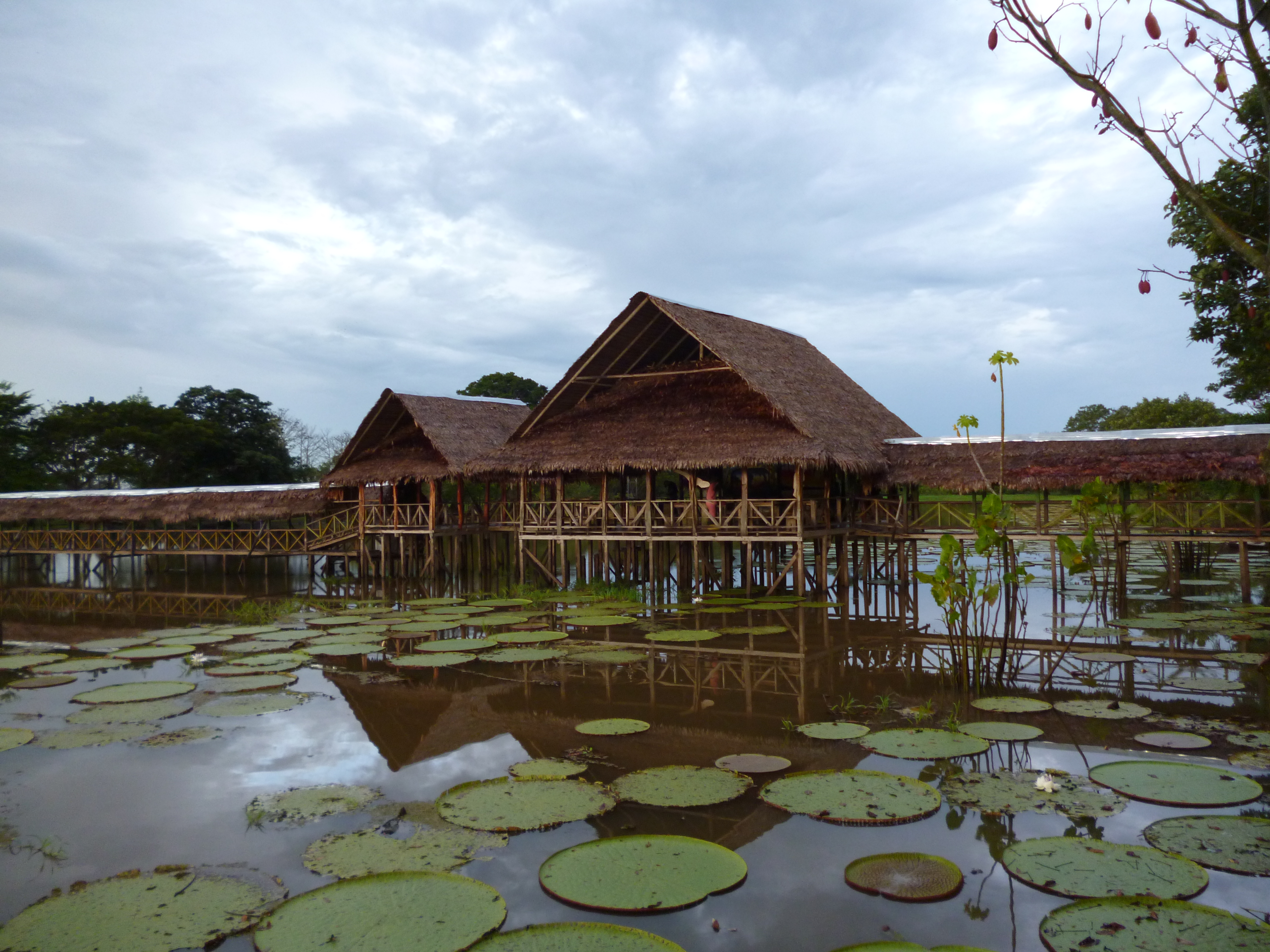
Amazonas shore.

A long-standing border dispute involving Leticia, between Colombia and Peru, was decided in 1934 by the League of Nations after these two nations were engulfed in an armed conflict known as the Colombia-Peru War. It is adjacent to the larger Brazilian city of Tabatinga. Together with the Peruvian city of Santa Rosa de Yavari, the entire urban area has more than 120,000 residents spread along the Amazon River.

== History ==
=== Early history and etymology ===
Early Leticia history mentions a Portuguese explorer who, after becoming lost in the Amazon, died of starvation at the present site of Leticia with the rest of his crew. The Peruvian captain Benigno Bustamante, then governor of the Peruvian department of Loreto, founded the city itself on April 25, 1867. Legend has it that when the Peruvian government decided to colonise the area (in order to prevent the Colombian government from claiming it first), they found a cross inscribed with the words "San Antonio", naming the new town after this cross.

A legend states that a Colombian soldier fell in love with an Amerindian woman named Leticia and decided to name the settlement after her. It could also have been named after Saint Leticia. However, Peruvian records indicate that on the 15 December 1867, the port of "San Antonio" was renamed to "Leticia" by Peruvian engineer Manuel Charón. Charón named the port in honor of a young female resident of the Peruvian city of Iquitos named Leticia Smith, who in fact, was his wife.

=== Territorial dispute ===
Small border incidents between Peru and Colombia occurred in 1911, and in 1922 the two governments of those countries reached a controversial agreement awarding the Leticia area to Colombia in exchange for recognizing Peru's rights to the zone south of the Putumayo River, which was also claimed by Ecuador. This agreement proved to be unpopular among the Peruvian population, despite the treaty's ratification in 1928, because the treaty was signed in secret and it awarded Colombia a region that had been founded by Peruvians and that had a large Peruvian population living within its borders.

The Colombia–Peru War began in September 1932 when two hundred Peruvians, followed later by military troops, occupied public buildings in Leticia, which was not garrisoned. Hand-to-hand combat ensued between small Colombian and Peruvian forces in early 1933. The conflict lasted until May 1933, when a cease-fire negotiated by the League of Nations went into effect in order to settle the conflict. The League finally awarded the disputed area to Colombia in June 1934.

=== Recent history ===
Though the League of Nations' intervention had officially ended the war, the Colombian government remained wary of the Peruvians, and decided to populate Leticia with people from Bogotá in order to ensure the town's loyalty to Colombia. Most of the people who came from Bogotá from the 1940s to 1965 still live in Leticia as of 2012. During that time Leticia has expanded greatly, with a new main street being built. However, the city's industries have changed little since then, with agriculture and tourism still the prime sources of income.

Tourism in Leticia has boomed and the town is today a recognized tourist site. International students travel to Leticia to learn Spanish. Meanwhile, students and visitors can enjoy the attractions nearby the city.

== Climate ==
Leticia features a tropical rainforest climate with minimal difference in average high and low temperatures throughout the course of the year. Leticia does have noticeably wetter and drier months, with its wettest month (March) seeing a little more than twice as much rain as its driest month (July). The average monthly rainfall in the city is consistently above 150 millimetres or 6 inches.

Climate data for Leticia (A.Vasquez Cobo), elevation 84 m (276 ft), (1981–2010)
Month	Jan	Feb	Mar	Apr	May	Jun	Jul	Aug	Sep	Oct	Nov	Dec	Year
Record high °C (°F)	35.8 (96.4)	36.4 (97.5)	35.9 (96.6)	36.2 (97.2)	33.8 (92.8)	34.2 (93.6)	35.2 (95.4)	35.7 (96.3)	38.3 (100.9)	38.5 (101.3)	37.5 (99.5)	39.0 (102.2)	39.0 (102.2)
Mean daily maximum °C (°F)	30.7 (87.3)	30.7 (87.3)	30.8 (87.4)	30.5 (86.9)	30.1 (86.2)	29.5 (85.1)	30.0 (86.0)	31.1 (88.0)	31.6 (88.9)	31.6 (88.9)	31.3 (88.3)	30.8 (87.4)	30.7 (87.3)
Daily mean °C (°F)	26.0 (78.8)	26.0 (78.8)	26.1 (79.0)	26.0 (78.8)	25.7 (78.3)	25.1 (77.2)	25.1 (77.2)	25.7 (78.3)	26.1 (79.0)	26.3 (79.3)	26.3 (79.3)	26.0 (78.8)	25.9 (78.6)
Mean daily minimum °C (°F)	23.0 (73.4)	22.9 (73.2)	23.0 (73.4)	23.0 (73.4)	22.7 (72.9)	21.8 (71.2)	21.2 (70.2)	21.5 (70.7)	22.0 (71.6)	22.6 (72.7)	22.9 (73.2)	22.9 (73.2)	22.5 (72.5)
Record low °C (°F)	18.0 (64.4)	19.2 (66.6)	17.0 (62.6)	18.2 (64.8)	16.0 (60.8)	14.3 (57.7)	14.6 (58.3)	14.8 (58.6)	16.4 (61.5)	18.3 (64.9)	17.6 (63.7)	18.0 (64.4)	14.3 (57.7)
Average precipitation mm (inches)	366.8 (14.44)	354.6 (13.96)	357.9 (14.09)	376.4 (14.82)	301.9 (11.89)	189.8 (7.47)	158.1 (6.22)	157.9 (6.22)	220.8 (8.69)	257.3 (10.13)	317.5 (12.50)	330.1 (13.00)	3,389.1 (133.43)
Average precipitation days (≥ 1.0 mm)	25	22	23	23	23	19	16	16	17	20	22	25	249
Average relative humidity (%)	88	88	88	88	88	88	86	85	85	86	87	88	87
Mean monthly sunshine hours	133.3	115.8	130.2	141.0	145.7	147.0	189.1	198.4	177.0	170.5	156.0	139.5	1,843.5
Mean daily sunshine hours	4.3	4.1	4.2	4.7	4.7	4.9	6.1	6.4	5.9	5.5	5.2	4.5	5.0
Source: Instituto de Hidrologia Meteorologia y Estudios Ambientales

== Biodiversity ==
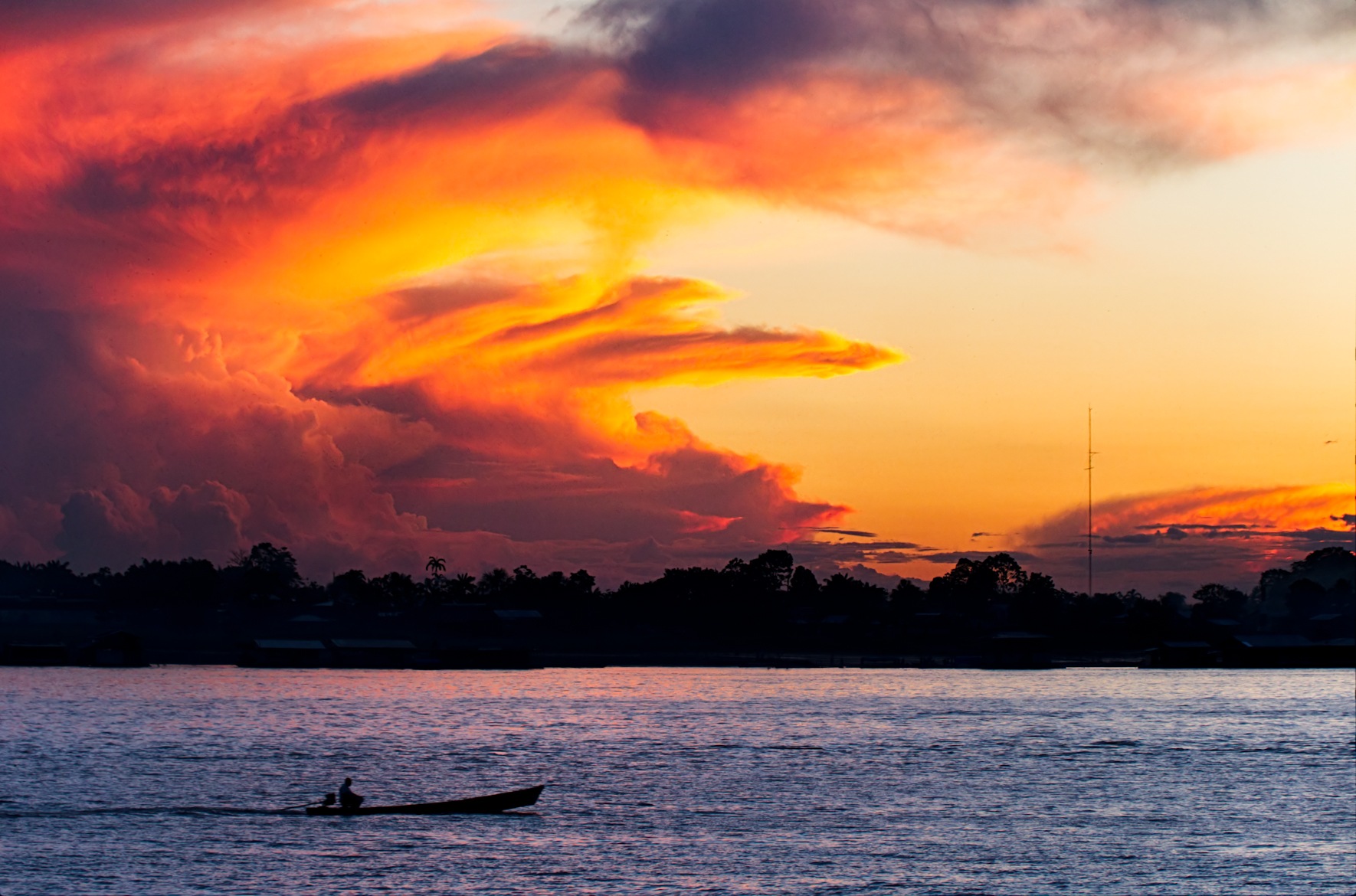
Sunset on the Amazon.

The frog fauna of Leticia is highly species rich. An intensive survey effort in primary rainforest and flooded forest some 10 km (6 miles) north of Leticia revealed 96 frog species (with two more found shortly afterwards). However, the true number may be as high as 123 species, based on species expected to occur in the area but not yet documented there.

== Culture ==
=== People ===
The majority of Leticia's population have migrated from elsewhere. There is no obviously dominant segment, but migrants from Bogotá, Medellín, and Tolima are the majority. Few people from Cali live in Leticia. A significant proportion of Leticia's population comprises native Amerindians (as opposed to mestizos or caboclos). The prevailing trend is for people to move from the village of their birth in far-lying rural communities into the city to make a "better" living.

The region is home to several indigenous people, including the Witoto, Inga, Tucano, Ticuna, and Nukak. The Peruvian Yagua settled in the riverside village of La Libertad in the 1990s.

=== Food ===
Although the inhabitants commonly eat the same things each week, a wide variety of food is available in Leticia. Dishes specific to each of Colombia's regions are made here. For example, people make Sancocho, a hearty soup, with regional variations in different parts of Colombia. But even within regions, each family has its own recipe. Leticia's cuisine includes Brazilian and Peruvian influences. Common staples in Leticia include river fish, domestic (and occasionally wild) meat, rice, locally-grown vegetables and potatoes. Meals are usually cooked over a wood-fired stovetop in a pan. A typical Sunday meal might comprise grilled meats, cooked in makeshift charcoal grillers, served with rice and plantains.

=== Education ===
Leticia is considered an important area for the study of the Amazon and its biodiversity.

- National University of Colombia at Leticia
- Universidad Antonio Nariño (UAN)
- Universidad Nacional Abierta y a Distancia (UNAD)
- University of the Amazon

== Attractions ==
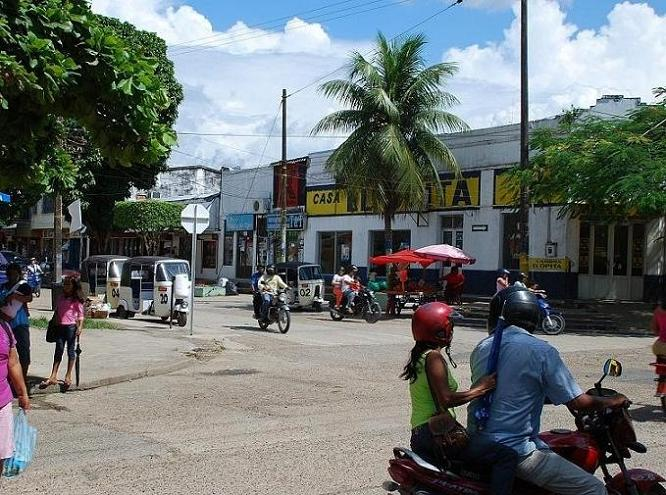
Downtown Leticia.

- Amacayacu National Park
- Parque nacional natural Cahuinarí
- Isla de los Micos (Monkey Island)
- Puerto Nariño, the only other Amazonas municipality
- Lago Tarapoto, where botos can be seen
- Lago Yahuarcacas
- Parque Ecologico Mundo Amazonico (Amazon World Ecological Park)
- Museum Banco de la República
- Orellana Park
- Santander Park
- Our Lady of Peace Cathedral

== Transportation ==
The Vásquez Cobo International Airport in Leticia is the largest airport in the south of Colombia. In addition to being the Colombian jungle region gateway, it also serves as the major airport in the triple-border region (Colombia, Brazil and Peru). For this reason, the airport handles the majority of passengers from the central Amazon region.

The city is not connected to the bulk of Colombia by road.

== Consular representation ==
Brazil has a Vice-consulate in Leticia.

== Notable people from Leticia ==
- Pedro Bernal, songwriter (b. 1960)

== See also ==
- Tabatinga, the Brazilian town and harbour that adjoins Leticia. The two cities cooperate closely, and altogether their urban area and adjacent suburbs along the Amazon River have a population of more than 100,000 people.
- Santa Rosa de Yavari
- Inírida, Guainía, another isolated Colombian city
