= Chalco (altépetl) =

Pre-Columbian Nahua confederacy in Mexico

Coordinates: 19°16′0″N 98°54′0″W

- 13th century – 1521
- Glyph
- Status: Tributary of the Aztec Empire (from 1465)
- Capital: Itzcahuacan, Tlalmanalco (de facto)
- Common languages: Nahuatl
- Religion: Pre-Columbian Nahua religion
- Historical era: Pre-Columbian
  - Established: 13th century
  - Aztec conquest: 1465
  - Spanish conquest: 1521
Succeeded by
Viceroyalty of New Spain

Chālco [ˈt͡ʃaːɬko] was a complex pre-Columbian Nahua altepetl or confederacy in central Mexico. It was divided into the four sub-altepeme of Tlalmanalco/Tlacochcalco, Amaquemecan, Tenanco Texopalco Tepopolla and Chimalhuacan-Chalco, which were themselves further subdivided into altepetl tlayacatl, each with its own tlatoani (king). The first two of these eventually took on more importance than the other two. Its inhabitants were known as the Chālcatl [ˈt͡ʃaːɬkat͡ɬ] (singular) or Chālcah [ˈt͡ʃaːɬkaʔ] (plural).

== History ==
According to Chimalpahin, the original peoples of Chalco were the Olmeca-Xicallanca, Xochtec, Quiyahuizteca, and Cocolca. They were known as sorcerers and rain-makers, and their capital was at the future location of Amaquemecan. There was a nearby sacred mountain known as Chalchiuhmomozco or Tamoanchan which was home to the water cult of Chalchiuhmatlalatl.

After the collapse of Tollan, Chalco was settled by a number of different Toltec and Chichimec groups.

Among the Toltec groups were the Acxotec, traders who patronized the deity Acollacatl Nahualtecuhtli. The Acxotec were accompanied by the Mihuaque, Tlaltecahuaque, Contec and Tlailotlaque, who all lacked nobilities of their own. Another Toltec group was the Teotenanca, originally from Aztlan but immediately from Teotenango where they had fought by Topiltzin Quetzalcoatl of Tollan. They patronized the deity Nauhyotecuhtli Xipil, probably a form of Xiuhtecuhtli, and were divided into six calpulli. In Chalco, the Teotenanca settled in Amaquemecan, occupying the districts of Tzacualtitan Tenanco (ruled by the Teohuatecuhtli) and Atlauhtlan Tenanco (ruled by the Tlailotlactecuhtli). A third Toltec group was the Nonoalca Teotlixca Tlacochcalca, who originated in Huehuetlapallan Nonoalco, migrating by sea to Tollan, where they performed gladiatorial sacrifice, and from there to Chalco. They arrived after the Acxotec and Mihuaque and ruled over them in Tlalmanalco by two rulers (the Teohuatecuhtli of Opochuacan Tlacochcalco, and the Tlatquictecuhtli of Itzcahuacan Tlacochcalco). Their patron god was Tlatlauhqui Tezcatlipoca. A separate Nonoalca group, clearly related to the Nonoalca of Puebla, settled in the Panohuayan district of Amaquemecan and were ruled by the Tlamaocatl tecuhtli.

Chief among the Chichimec groups in Chalco were the Totolimpanec, who originated in Aztlan Chicomoztoc and arrived after the Nonoalca. They conquered Amaquemecan from the Olmec, settling in the district of Itztlacozauhcan where they were ruled by the Chichimeca tecuhtli. Their patron gods were 1 Flintknife (Mixcoatl), 9 Monkey (Itzpapalotl) and 9 Wind (Ehecatl). Accompanying the Totolimpanec were the Tecuanipantlec, who lived in two districts of Amaquemecan and patronized Citecatl (a name for Mixcoatl).

In the 14th and early 15th centuries, flower wars were fought between the Chalca and the Aztecs. Serious war erupted in 1446. According to the Amaqueme historian Chimalpahin, this was because the Chalca refused a Mexica demand to contribute building materials for the temple of Huitzilopochtli. Chalco was finally conquered by the Aztecs under Moctezuma I in or around 1465, and the kings of Chalco were exiled to Huexotzinco. The rulerships were restored by Tizoc in 1486, who installed new tlatoque. This was achieved, in part, by the diplomacy work carried out by the Chalcan musician Quecholcohuatl when he performed a politically-driven composition for Axayacatl in 1479. This story was recorded by Chimalpahin in the seventh of his Eight Relations (see The liberation of Chalco). Chalco paid more tribute to Tenochtitlan in the form of food than any other region in the Valley of Mexico, probably because of its fertile soil and location.

The Spanish conquistadors Pedro de Alvarado and Bernardino Vázquez de Tapia reached Chalco in the fall of 1519. The Chalca allied with the Spaniards and participated in the defeat of the Aztecs. Hernán Cortés claimed Chalco for himself as an encomienda, but failed to maintain his possession of it. Chalco was designated a corregimiento by 1533. Several places outside the traditional region of Chalco were added to it in colonial times, such as Tláhuac, Mixquic and Ixtapaluca.

== See also ==
- Chalco de Díaz Covarrubias, current municipality, home to ancient Chalco altepetl and part of Greater Mexico City.
- Valle de Chalco Solidaridad, municipality, part of Greater Mexico City.
