= Xilomantzin =

15th-century tlatoani (king) of Culhuacan

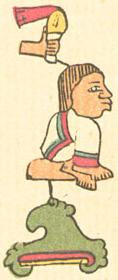
- Xilomantzin, with his name glyph (top) and the glyph of Culhuacan (bottom), in the Codex Telleriano-Remensis.

Tlatoani of Culhuacan
- In office 13 Flint (1440) – 7 House (1473)
- Preceded by: Acoltzin
- Succeeded by: Tlatolcaltzin

Personal details
- Died: 7 House (1473) Tlatelolco
- Spouse: Izquixotzin
- Children: Acolmiztli
- Parents: Acoltzin (father); Tlacochcuetzin (mother)

Xilomantzin was the tlatoani ("king") of the pre-Columbian altepetl (ethnic state) of Culhuacan in the Valley of Mexico from 1440 to 1473.

Xilomantzin was the son of Acoltzin, the previous ruler of Culhuacan, and Tlacochcuecihuatl or Tlacochcuetzin, a daughter of Tezozomoctli, ruler of Azcapotzalco. He succeeded his father in the year 13 Flint (1440). He married Izquixotzin, the daughter of Tlacateotl, ruler of Tlatelolco, and had a son named Acolmiztli.

In the year 7 House (1473), Xilomantzin sided with Moquihuixtli, then ruler of Tlatelolco, in a conflict against Tenochtitlan (led by Axayacatl), which resulted in both Moquihuixtli and Xilomantzin being killed.

== Notes ==
| Preceded by Acoltzin | Tlatoani of Culhuacan; 1440–1473 | Succeeded by Tlatolcaltzin |
