= Pedro Bernal =

Colombian songwriter, singer, and music researcher

- Also known as: Golden Voice of the Amazon
- Born: Pedro Bernal Méndez; 1960 (age 64–65); Leticia, Colombia
- Genres: música popular amazonense

Pedro Bernal Méndez (Note: In this Spanish name, the first or paternal surname is Bernal and the second or maternal family name is Méndez.) (born 1960) is a Colombian songwriter, singer, and researcher of Amazonian music. He composes in the genre of música popular amazonense (Spanish for "Amazonian popular music"), which is influenced by the music of Brazil, Peru, and Colombia, whose borders meet in his hometown of Leticia.

== Biography ==
Pedro Bernal Méndez was born in 1960 in Leticia, in the Colombian department of Amazonas. His mother was from Brazil, and his father was from the coastal Colombian department of Nariño.

Bernal is a songwriter, singer, and researcher of Amazonian music. He is known as the "golden voice of the Amazon" (Spanish: la voz de oro del Amazonas). He composes in the style of música popular amazonense (Spanish for "Amazonian popular music"), a term coined by music researcher Alfonso Dávila Ribeiro that is reminiscent of the Paisa genre of música popular. The genre draws from the music of Brazil, Peru, and Colombia, whose borders meet at the Tres Fronteras in Leticia. Bernal has said that people from Leticia live as if there is no border, and that his nationality is Amazonian.

Bernal is particularly known for his song "Mariquiña" (or "Mariquinha"), which Radio Nacional de Colombia describes as "a portrait of Amazonian women, their environment and their customs", and which he performed at the third Concurso de Intérpretes de Música Colombiana in Bogotá in 1987. Other notable songs written by Bernal are "La Otra Bonanza" and "Leticia Linda".
