= Diego de Alvarado Huanitzin =

Don Diego de Alvarado Huanitzin
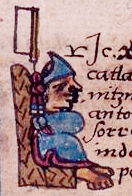

Tlatoani of Tenochtitlan
- Reign: 1538 – 1541
- Installation: 1538
- Predecessor: Pablo Xochiquentzin
- Successor: Diego de San Francisco Tehuetzquititzin

Governor of San Juan Tenochtitlan
- In office 1538 – 1541
- Preceded by: Pablo Xochiquentzin
- Succeeded by: Diego de San Francisco Tehuetzquititzin

Tlatoani of Ecatepec
- Reign: 1520 – 1538
- Predecessor: Chimalpilli II
- Died: 1541
- Spouse: Francisca de Moctezuma
- Father: Tezozomoctli Acolnahuacatl

Don Diego de Alvarado Huanitzin (or Panitzin) was a 16th-century Nahua noble. A grandson of Axayacatl, nephew of tlatoani Moctezuma II. He was initially the tlatoani (ruler) of Ecatepec before becoming tlatoani of Tenochtitlan, as well as its first governor under the colonial Spanish system of government.

== Biography ==
=== Early positions ===
He was initially the tlatoani (ruler) of Ecatepec before becoming tlatoani of Tenochtitlan, as well as its first governor under the colonial Spanish system of government. He had been designated governor (tlatoani) of Ecatépec by Moctezuma, in the year 2 Técpatl after the death of Chimalpilli the former tlatoani. Moctezuma was already a prisoner of Cortés in Tenochtitlan, the people of Ecatepec accepted him as their ruler and hid him along with his mother.

=== Captivity and baptism ===
After the fall of Tenochtitlan, he was one of the five Aztec lords held captive by Cortés along with Cuauhtemoc, the cihuacohuatl Tlacotzin, Oquiztzin, and Motelchiuhtzin. Along them he was also tortured, with his feet burned, because of the gold lost by the Spaniards when they had to flee Tenochtitlan.

Huanitzin was baptized with the Spanish Christian name Diego. He took the surname de Alvarado from his baptismal sponsor — probably Pedro de Alvarado or one of his brothers, whose uncle with whom they came to America was named Diego de Alvarado.

=== Governor of Tenochtitlan ===
Cortés took Huanitzin along with many other indigenous rulers in his travel to Honduras. He was spared from execution when Cuauhtemoc was hanged by Cortés along with Tetlepanquetzatzin, tlatoani of Tlacopan and don Pedro Cohuanacochtzin. After the return of Cortés, Huanitzin was released and returned as Tlatoani of Ecatepec, where he ruled 14 years.

As the grandson of a former Tlatoani, in the year 7 Tochtli (1538), he was chosen as the first governor of Tenochtitlan (Mexico), by the don Antonio de Mendoza, first viceroy of México. Tenochtitlan had been without official ruler for almost a year.

== Personal life and death ==
Don Diego de Alvarado Huanitzin died in 1541. Among his children were Doña Juana de Alvarado, who married Huehue Totoquihuaztli, ruler of Tlacopan; Don Cristóbal de Guzmán Cecetzin, who later became governor of Tenochtitlan; Don Hernando de Alvarado Tezozomoc, an interpreter known today for the Crónica mexicayotl; and Doña Isabel, who married Antonio Valeriano, who would also become governor of Tenochtitlan. Through Doña Juana de Alvarado, Don Diego de Alvarado Huanitzin is among the royal ancestors of the Guerrero-Dávila-Moctezuma, a prominent noble family during the Viceroyalty of the New Spain and whose descendants are still present today in Mexico City.

== Mass of St. Gregory ==
The Mass of St Gregory, possibly by Huanitzin.

Huanitzin may have created a featherwork representation of the Mass of Saint Gregory, after a Dutch engraving. Dated 1539, it is the earliest dated work of art in New Spain.

== See also ==
- List of Tenochtitlan rulers

== Notes ==
Regnal titles
| Preceded by Chimalpilli II | Tlatoani of Ecatepec; 1520–1538 | Succeeded by ? |
| Preceded by Pablo Xochiquentzin as quauhtlatoani | Tlatoani of Tenochtitlan; 1538–1541 | Succeeded by Diego de San Francisco Tehuetzquititzin |
Political offices
| New title | Governor of San Juan Tenochtitlan; 1538–1541 | Succeeded by Diego de San Francisco Tehuetzquititzin |
