= Susan D. Gillespie =

American anthropologist and archaeologist

Susan D. Gillespie (born 1952) is an American academic anthropologist and archaeologist, noted for her contributions to archaeological and ethnohistorical research on pre-Columbian Mesoamerican cultures, in particular the Aztec, Maya and Olmec. As of 2009 Gillespie holds a position as professor in the Department of Anthropology at University of Florida, Gainesville, USA, having also been associate chair of the department from 2003 until 2009.

Her first book published in 1989, The Aztec Kings: The Construction of Rulership in Mexica History, received the American Society for Ethnohistory's Erminie Wheeler-Voegelin Prize in 1990. Dr. Gillespie is also the recipient the 2002 Gordon R. Willey Prize from the American Anthropological Association, and the 2012 Patty Jo Watson Distinguished Lecturer, American Anthropological Association, Archaeology Division: "The Entanglement of Jade and the Rise of Mesoamerica."

Gillespie was elected President-Elect of the Archaeology Division of the American Anthropological Association in 2003, serving as President from 2005 to 2007. She was certified with the Register of Professional Archaeologists in 2006. In 2010 she was elected as a Member of the Executive Board of the American Anthropological Association, her term expiring in November 2013.
