= Atotoztli I =

Atotoztli of Culhuacan
- Princess
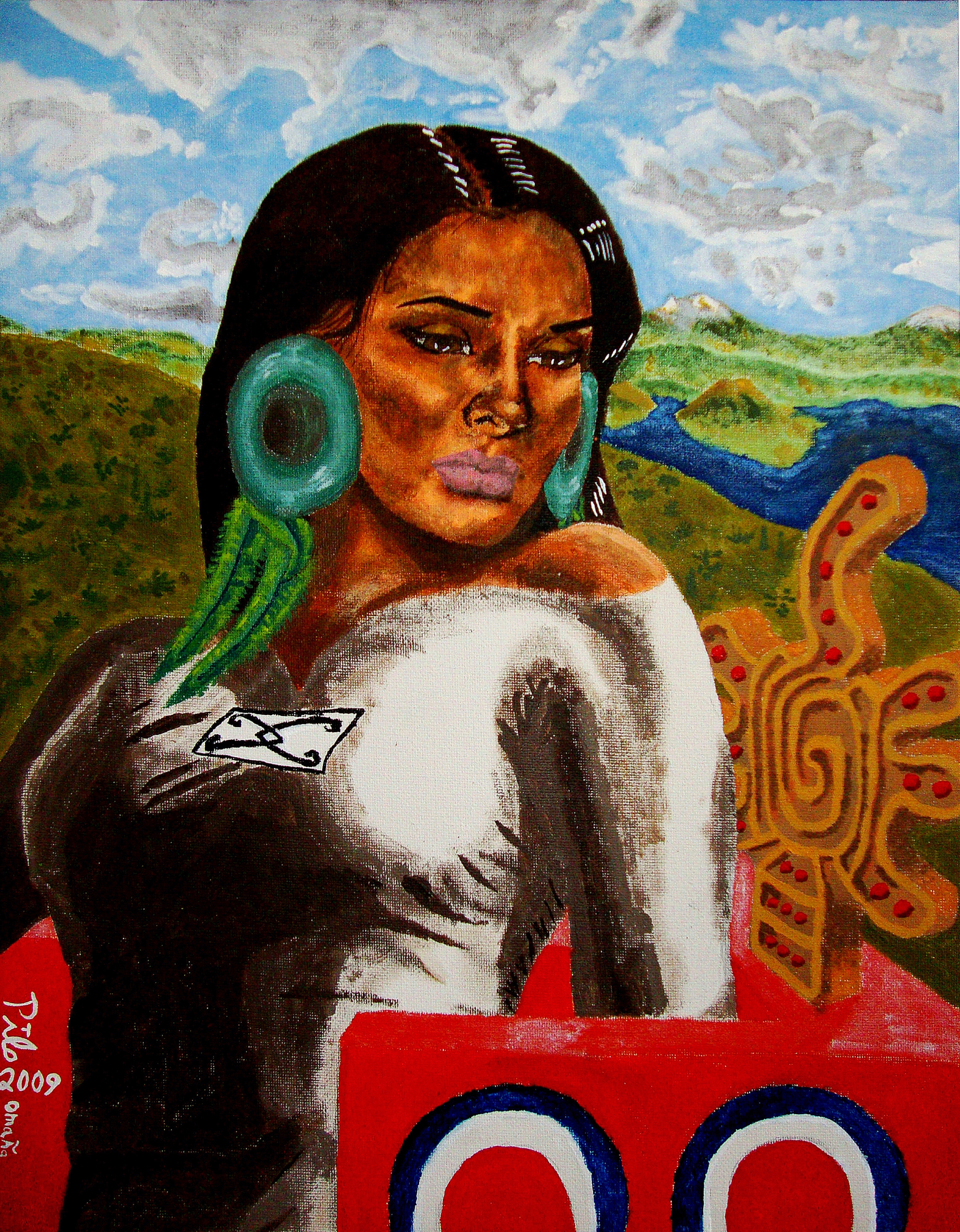
- Spouse: Prince Huetzin of Culhuacan
- Issue: Acolmiztli, King of Coatlinchan; Coaxochitzin, Princess of Coatlinchan; Coazanac, Princess of Coatlinchan; Quecholtecpantzin Quauhtlachtli, Prince of Coatlinchan; Tlatonal Tetliopeuhqui, Prince of Coatlinchan; Memexoltzin Itztlolinqui, Prince of Coatlinchan; Chicomacatzin Matzicol, Prince of Coatlinchan
Regnal name
- Atototzin
- House: House of Culhuacan (by birth); House of Coatlinchan (by marriage)
- Father: Achitometl
- Mother: Xolocihuatl
- Religion: Toltec

Atotoztli I (Classical Nahuatl: Ātōtōztli [atoˈtostɬi]) also known as Atototzin, was a Toltec princess of Culhuacan, member of the House of Culhuacan and queen consort of Coatlinchan by marriage. She is mostly known for being the reason of the Yacanex War.

== Family ==
Atotoztli was a daughter of King Achitometl of Culhuacan and Queen Xolocihuatl of Culhuacan. She was the sister of Ilancueitl, dynastic founder of Tenochtitlan. Her husband was Huetzin of Coatlinchan.

== Background ==
After the kingdom of Culhuacan was incorporated by force into the Chichimec Empire, during the times of King Nauhyotzin, King Achitometl was loyal to the Chichimec Emperor, Xolotl Amacui. This kingdom as well as the other within the realm were subservient to the Chichimec Emperor's decrees. Royal marriages were part of the policy dictated by the high ruler. Atotoztli was ordered by Xolotl to marry Prince Huetzin of Coatlinchan, an order everyone complied except for Yacanex, a rogue lord of Tepetlaoztoc. Yacanex had intentions to marry Atotoztli but after being unable to secure the marriage he led a rebellion against the Chichimec Empire.

== Yacanex War ==
Yacanex, a minor lord, and an ethnic Chichimec, was uncomfortable by the Chichimec Emperor's laws which affected Yacanex's people, their culture, and their land. The denial to marry Princess Atotoztli was the thing that made Yacanex rise and lead his region of Tepetlaoztoc in a revolt against the Chichimec Emperor. As Yacanex amassed a great army and incited other regions and kingdoms to join him, he burned maize fields on his way to Culhuacan.

Atotoztli was sent away from Culhuacan on a boat when her father, King Achitometl, learned that Yacanex's army was headed to their city to capture the coveted princess by force. Codex Xolotl, an important indigenous document, shows Atotoztli leaving her kingdom in tears, as she escaped just before the arrival of Yacanex forces. Accompanied by her sister Ilancueitl, she was safely taken to Coatlinchan, the kingdom of her husband-to-be.

Once in Coatlinchan, Atotoztli successfully married Huetzin. Yacanex continued the rebellion, gathering more support from unhappy Chichimecs. Yacanex insisted in taking Atototzli, which ultimately led his army to face Huetzin's warriors and the Chichimec army, who were protecting Atotoztli. When Yacanex was defeated, Atotoztli's marriaged with Huetzin was secured.

== Reign ==
Although Atotoztli entered the House of Coatlinchan by marriage, it was her Toltec lineage which brought prestige, power, and legitimacy to Coatlinchan. She became Queen consort of Coatlinchan. Her children with Huetzin secured for the House of Coatlinchan the authority that comes from being descendants of Topiltzin Quetzalcoatl, and thus political heirs of the Toltecs. Topiltzin Quetzalcoatl and Toltec lineage functioned as political symbolism to legitimize imperial power, especially because these kingdoms wanted to emulate the long-gone Toltec Empire. Atotoztli, by establishing her power in Coatlinchan, diminished Culhuacan's prominence to the point that the kingdom was incorporated into Coatlinchan.

== Descendancy ==
Atotoztli was an ancestor of many Aztec emperors, kings of Texcoco and of Tenochtitlan. She was also ancestor of famed poet King Nezahualcoyotl.

== Bibliography ==
- Hubert Howe Bancroft (1876). The Native Races of the Pacific States of North America: Primitive history. 1876. Vol. 5. D. Appleton.
- Chimalpahin Cuauhtlehuanitzin, Domingo Francisco de San Antón Muñón (1997). "Mexican History or Chronicle". Codex Chimalpahin: society and politics in Mexico Tenochtitlan, Tlatelolco, Texcoco, Culhuacan, and other Nahua altepetl in central Mexico: the Nahuatl and Spanish annals and accounts collected by don Domingo de San Antón Muñón Chimalpahin Quauhtlehuanitzin. Edited and translated by Arthur J. O. Anderson and Susan Schroeder. Norman: University of Oklahoma Press. pp. 25–177. ISBN 0-8061-2921-2.
