= Luis de Santa María Nanacacipactzin =

Cipac
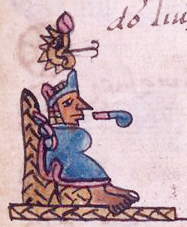

Tlatoani and Governor of Tenochtitlan
- Reign: 30 September 1563 – 27 December 1565
- Installation: 30 September 1563
- Predecessor: Cristóbal de Guzmán Cecetzin
- Successor: Francisco Jiménez (as judge-governor)

Alcalde of San Juan Tenochtitlan
- In office: 1557
- Predecessor: Miguel Sánchez Yscatl; Cristóbal de Guzmán Cecetzin
- Successor: Martín Cano; Pedro de la Cruz Tlapaltecatl
- Co-Alcalde: Tomás de Aquino Yspopulac
- Died: 27 December 1565

Don Luis de Santa María Nanacacipactzin, also known as Cipac, was the last tlatoani ("king") of the Nahua altepetl of Tenochtitlan, as well as its governor (gobernador) under the colonial Spanish system of government. The previous ruler Cristóbal de Guzmán Cecetzin having died in 1562, Nanacacipactzin was installed on September 30, 1563, and ruled until his death on December 27, 1565.

His rule was dominated by disputes with the Spanish colonial government over tribute payments. In January 1564, the viceroyalty passed a law requiring the Tenochca to pay 14,000 pesos in annual tribute, as well as a large payment in corn. Nanacacipactzin resisted this demand, and faced a number of Spanish-backed lawsuits as a result, even being arrested for three days in September 1564 for failing to secure agreement to the new payments. His mental and physical health declined as a result, and this likely contributed to his death in December 1565.

With Nanacacipactzin's death, the rule of Tenochtitlan by dynastic tlatoque (plural of tlatoani) came to an end. As governor, he was succeeded in 1568 by Francisco Jiménez, who was a native of Tecamachalco rather than Tenochtitlan.

His Nahuatl name, Nanacacipactli (or Nanacacipactzin in the honorific form), literally means "mushroom alligator". It appears his birth name was simply Cipactli "alligator", and the "mushroom" element was added as a nickname, possibly due to a perception that he was ineffective in resisting Spanish tribute demands.

== See also ==
- List of Tenochtitlan rulers
- Aztec emperors family tree

== Notes ==
Regnal titles
Preceded by Cristóbal de Guzmán Cecetzin	Tlatoani of Tenochtitlan; 1563–1565	None
Political offices
Preceded by Cristóbal de Guzmán Cecetzin	Governor of San Juan Tenochtitlan; 1563–1565	Vacant Title next held by Francisco Jiménez as judge-governor
Preceded by Miguel Sánchez Yscatl and Cristóbal de Guzmán Cecetzin	Alcalde of San Juan Tenochtitlan; 1557 with Tomás de Aquino Yspopulac	Succeeded by Martín Cano and Pedro de la Cruz Tlapaltecatl
