= Juan Bautista (theologian) =

Mexican Franciscan theologian and writer

Juan Bautista (born in Mexico, 1555; date of death unknown, but probably between 1606 and 1615) was a Mexican Franciscan theologian and writer.

== Life ==
He joined the Franciscans in his native city, and taught theology and metaphysics at the convent of St. Francis of Mexico. He was also a definitor of the province, and became Guardian of Tezcuco twice (1595 and 1606), of Tlatelolco (1600), and of Tacuba in 1605.

== Works ==
A number of his works are known by title only. Ten of these were written in the Nahuatl language, previous to 1607; several were printed at Mexico. He learned Nahuatl after joining the Franciscans.
