= List of tlatoque of Tenochtitlan =

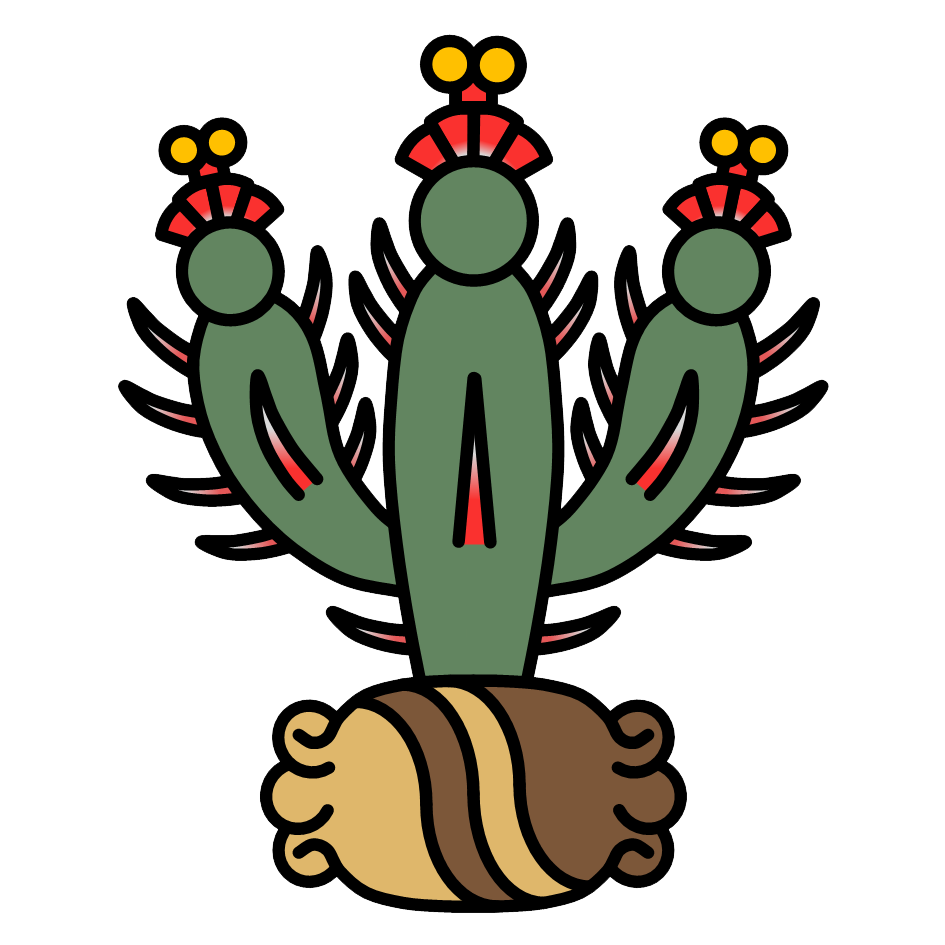
Glyph of Tenochtitlan

This is a list of Mesoamerican rulers of the altepetl of Tenochtitlan (modern Mexico City) from its foundation in 1325 until the end of the line of indigenous rulers. From c. 1375 onwards, the rulers of Tenochtitlan were monarchs and used the title tlatoani.

From 1427 to 1521, the tlatoque of Tenochtitlan were alongside those of the cities Tetzcoco and Tlacopan the leaders of the powerful Triple Alliance, commonly known as the Aztec Empire. The rulers of Tenochtitlan were always pre-eminent and gradually transitioned into the sole rulers of the empire; under either Tizoc (1481–1486) or Ahuitzotl (1486–1502), the tlatoque of Tenochtitlan assumed the grander title huehuetlatoani ("supreme tlatoani") to indicate their superiority over the other tlatoque in the alliance. The evolution into full autocracy was finished by 1502, when Moctezuma II was elected as huehuetlatoani of Tenochtitlan without the traditional input from Tetzcoco and Tlacopan.

In 1521, the Aztec Empire was conquered by the Spaniards under Hernán Cortés and a large number of Mesoamerican allies. Tenochtitlan was destroyed and replaced by Mexico City, though the Spanish colonial authorities continued to appoint tlatoque of Tenochtitlan until the office was abolished in 1565.

== Early Tenochtitlan (1325–1375) ==
Portrait	Name	Reign	Succession and notes	Life details
	Tenoch; Tenōch	c. 1325–1375 (?) (50 years?)	Legendary founder of Tenochtitlan; historicity unconfirmed. According to legend, Tenoch was the first human leader of the Mexica, succeeding the Sun god Huītzilōpōchtli.	Next to nothing known

== Monarchic period (1375–1525) ==
The monarchic period of Tenochtitlan extends from the assumption of the title of tlatoani by Acamapichtli in 1377 to the death of Cuauhtémoc in 1525, after the arrival of the Spaniards. The accession of Acampapichtli c. 1375 marks the traditional beginning of the Aztec king list. The early Tenochtitlan rulers before Itzcoatl were vassals under the suzerainty of the Tepanecs.

=== Pre-imperial tlatoque (1375–1427) ===
Portrait	Name	Reign	Succession and notes	Life details
	Acamapichtli; Ācamāpichtli	c. 1375–1390 (15 years)	Had matrilineal Toltec ancestry. Oversaw the expansion and development of Tenochtitlan. Assisted his overlord Tezozomoc of Azcapotzalco in making substantial territorial gains throughout Mesoamerica.	c. 1350–1390 (aged 40) Died of natural causes
	Huitzilihuitl; Huītzilihhuitl	c. 1391–1414 (23 years)	Son of Acamapichtli (1375–1390). Conquered lands on behalf of his Tepanec overlords. The Mexica people as a whole were transformed into a more militarized people in the time of Huitzilihuitil.	? – 1410 Died of natural causes
	Chimalpopoca; Chīmalpopōca	c. 1415–1427 (18 years)	Son of Acamapichtli (1375–1390). Devoted much of his reign to building projects and urban development. Considered the first Mexican martyr.	? – 1427 Became embroiled in Tepanec succession conflicts, supported the wrong side and was imprisoned. Hanged himself in captivity.
	Xihuitl Temoc; Xīhuitl Tēmoc	1427 (60 days)	Son of Chimalpopoca (1415–1427). Young at the time of his accession.	? – 1427 Unclear fate; perhaps killed in battle or murdered by a relative

=== Aztec Empire (1427–1521) ===
Portrait	Name	Reign	Succession and notes	Life details
	Itzcoatl; Itzcōhuātl	1427–1440 (13 years)	Son of Acamapichtli (1375–1390) and a slave. Defeated and killed the Tepanec ruler Maxtla and created the Triple Alliance alongside the rulers of the cities Tetzcoco and Tlacopan.	? – 1440 Died of natural causes
	Moctezuma I Motēuczōma Ilhuicamīna	1440–1466 (26 years)	Son of Huitzilihuitl (1391–1414). Though his reign was plagued by an unusual number of natural disasters, Moctezuma I oversaw an age of impressive construction works and far-ranging conquests. Began the flower wars.	? – 1466 Died of natural causes
	Atotoztli; Atotoztli	1466–1472 (6 years)	Daughter of Moctezuma I (1440–1466). Suggested by two later documents to have served as tlatoani in her own right between the reigns of Moctezuma I and Axayacatl.	? – 1472 (?) Died of natural causes
	Axayacatl; Āxāyacatl	1472–1481 (9 years)	Grandson of Itzcoatl (1427–1440). A famous warrior-king, Axayacatl continued to work on construction works and expand the empire.	1450/1451–1481 (aged 30/31) Died of illness
	Tizoc; Tīzocic	1481–1486 (5 years)	Grandson of Itzcoatl (1427–1440). Succeeded his brother Axayacatl. Although he was sickly, Tizoc oversaw the expansion and beautification of Tenochtitlan and the establishment of Aztec outposts far from central imperial territory.	? – 1486 Possibly poisoned
	Ahuitzotl; Āhuitzotl	1486–1502 (16 years)	Grandson of Itzcoatl (1427–1440). The elder brother of his two immediate predecessors, Ahuitzotl was a strong and militaristic ruler, expanding the empire further and ordering unprecedently large numbers of ritual human sacrifices.	? – 1502 Killed in a flood of Tenochtitlan
	Moctezuma II; Motēuczōma Xōcoyōtl	1502–1520 (18 years)	Son of Axayacatl (1472–1481). Oversaw a period of centralization and strengthening of the Aztec Empire. Disciplined and highly successful ruler before he made contact with the Spaniards in 1519, whereafter the Spanish conquest of the Aztec Empire began.	c. 1466–1520 (aged 53–54) Several accounts exist; possibly strangled by the Spaniards or struck in the head during a speech by rock thrown by one of his subjects
	Cuitláhuac; Cuitlāhuac	1520 (80 days)	Son of Axayacatl (1472–1481). Commander of the Aztec armed forces at the time of Moctezuma's death and quickly elected as tlatoani. Fought bravely to expel the Spaniards from Tenochtitlan.	? – December 1520 Died of smallpox
	Cuauhtémoc; Cuāuhtēmoc	1520–1525 (5 years)	Grandson of Ahuitzotl (1486–1502). Elected as tlatoani after Cuitláhuac's death. Killed several of Moctezuma II's children to safeguard his right to the throne. Led fierce resistance against the Spaniards but was captured and defeated in 1521. Retained position and title under Spanish rule but held in custody. Seen as a national hero in Mexico.	1502 – 28 February 1525 (aged 23) Charged with plotting and hanged by Hernán Cortés

== Colonial period (1525–1565) ==
The Spanish colonial authorities continued to appoint tlatoque of Tenochtitlan for several decades after the conquest.

=== Cuauhtlatoque (1525–1536) ===
The initial rulers of Tenochtitlan installed by the Spaniards were not part of the nobility and did not go through the traditional investiture ceremonies. As a result, they were not regarded as legitimate tlatoani by the local populace. Instead, they were titled as cuauhtlatoani, a term that literally meant "eagle ruler" and in pre-conquest times served to designate a non-dynastic interim ruler appointed when necessary. Hernán Cortés and the Spaniards initially preferred such less legitimate rulers, possibly as a way of ensuring that the colonial authorities would be able to maintain control.

Though the cuauhtlatoque appointed by the Spaniards were not legitimate dynastic rulers, they were noted in later chronicles as governing as if they were tlatoani. Codices made after the time of the cuauhtlatoque differ in how they are treated; some emphasize their illegitimacy as a rupture in the dynastic sequence whereas others do not comment on their lack of relation to previous rulers and instead depict them in the exact same way, as if they were genuine tlatoque.

Portrait	Name	Reign	Succession and notes	Life details
	Tlacotzin; Juan Velázquez Tlacotzin	1525 / 1525–1526 (less than a year)	Appointed by Hernan Cortés. Previously served as cihuacoatl (a senior political office). Appears to have worked alongside the Spaniards for some time since he enjoyed a privileged position before his appointment.	? – 1525/1526 Died of disease on the way to Tenochtitlan; never took power in the city (Note: He is for this reason completely omitted in some accounts.)
	Motelchiuhtzin; Andrés de Tapia Motelchiuh	1525/1526–1530/1531 (5 years)	Commoner from Tenochtitlan and a distinguished military captain. Swiftly appointed by Hernan Cortés after Tlacotzin's death.	? – 1530/1531 Killed by an arrow during a battle with Colhuacan
	Xochiquentzin; Pablo Xochiquentzin	1532–1536 (4 years)	Commoner who had previously served as calpixqui (a minor political office).	? – 1536 Died of natural causes

=== Resumption of dynastic rule (1538–1565) ===
The royal line of tlatoque was restored in 1538. The decision to restore dynastic rule was probably made by the Spanish viceroy Antonio de Mendoza (1535–1550) to preserve the veneer of legitimacy of Spanish rule. Since the Spaniards mainly wished local native rulers to be responsible, pay tribute and be legitimate in the eyes of the people they ruled, the tlatoani were from that point onwards most often appointed after being elected and suggested by the native Nahua nobility.

Portrait	Name	Reign	Succession and notes	Life details
	Huanitzin; Diego de Alvarado Huanitzin	1538–1541 (3 years)	Grandson of Axayacatl (1472–1481). Appointed by the Spaniards due to being well-liked by the Nahua people and being able to speak Spanish; his accession marked the restoration of the royal line. Regarded as a distinguished Mexica ruler of the colonial period.	? – 1541 Died of natural causes
	Tehuetzquititzin; Diego de San Francisco Tehuetzquititzin	1541–1554 (14 years)	Grandson of Tizoc (1481–1486). Appointed by the Spanish viceroy on the suggestion of the Nahua nobility. Well-liked by his subjects. His reign was marked by a devastating epidemic in the 1540s. Worked to defend the resources of his community and the wealth of his family from his colonial overlords.	? – 1554 Died of natural causes
Interregnum: Esteban de Guzmán Omacatzin (a Nahua commoner from Xochimilco) serves as judge of Tenochtitlan 1554–1557. Evidence suggests his power was regarded to be temporary and transitional.
	Cecetzin; Cristóbal de Guzmán Cecetzin	1557–1562 (5 years)	Son of Huanitzin (1538–1541). Appointed by the Spanish viceroy on the suggestion of the Nahua nobility. The reason for the lengthy interregnum preceding his accession is unknown. (Note: Possible reasons include a lengthy election process owing to several possible candidates (both Huanitizin and Tehuetzquititzin had several sons) and Cecetzin being the intended successor from early on but being too young before 1557.)	? – 1562 Died of natural causes
	Cipac; Luis de Santa María Cipac (Nanacacipactzin)	1563–1565 (2 years)	Grandson of Ahuitzotl (1486–1502). The last tlatoani. Appointed by the Spanish viceroy on the suggestion of the Nahua nobility. His tenure as tlatoani was plagued by legal issues and disagreements on taxes with the colonial authorities.	? – December 1565 Died due to health issues brought on by his stressful tenure as tlatoani

After 1565, the governors of Tenochtitlan ceased to be appointed under the principle of hereditary succession and ceased to be referred to as tlatoani. This change was partly a result of experiences with Spanish election principles making the denizens of Tenochtitlan view hereditary descent as less important for legitimacy. From the death of Cipac in 1565 until 1812, Tenochtitlan was instead placed under the control of Spanish-appointed governors; these governors continued to be of indigenous or mixed descent and many were descendants of Aztec nobility, though not of the royal dynasty.

== See also ==
- Family tree of Aztec monarchs
- History of the Aztecs
- The other (subservient) leaders of the Triple Alliance:
  - List of tlatoque of Tetzcoco
  - List of rulers of Tlacopan
- Other rulers to the south:
  - Maya monarchs
  - Mixtec monarchs
