= Colhuacan (altepetl) =

Pre-Columbian city-state in Mexico

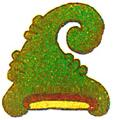
Aztec glyph for Culhuacan

Culhuacan (Classical Nahuatl: Cōlhuahcān [koːlˈwaʔkaːn]) was one of the Nahuatl-speaking pre-Columbian city-states of the Valley of Mexico. According to tradition, Culhuacan was founded by the Toltecs under Mixcoatl and was the first Toltec city. The Nahuatl speakers agreed that Culhuacán was the first city to give its rulers the title of "speaker" (tlatoani). In the sixteenth century following the Spanish conquest of the Aztec Empire, Culhuacan was incorporated into colonial New Spain and called a pueblo, but in local-level documentation in Nahuatl, residents continued to use the designation altepetl for their settlement.

== History ==
Traditionally the Culhua were said to have originated in a place called Tecolhuacan, beyond Tollan, but migrated to Tollan and participated in the Toltec culture, where they worshipped Huitzilopochtli and Tezcatlipoca. Later, their patron deities were Cinteotl and Cihuacoatl.

Culhuacan was perhaps the first of the chinampa towns founded on the shores of Lake Xochimilco, with chinampas dating to 1100 C.E. From written records there is evidence that Culhuacan survived the fall of Tollan and maintained its prestige until the mid-14th century. The Culhua subjugated a number of towns including Ocuilan, Malinalco, Xochimilco and Cuitlahuac, possibly allied with the Tepanec of Azcapotzalco and the Acolhua of Coatlinchan. According to the Crónica Mexicayotl, transcribed in 1609, in 1299, Culhuacan's tlatoani, Coxcoxtli, helped the Tepanecs of Azcapotzalco, the Xochimilca and other cities expel the Mexica from Chapultepec. Coxcoxtli then gave the Mexica permission to settle in the barren land of Tizaapan, southwest of Chapultepec, and they became vassals of Culhuacan. The Mexica subsequently assimilated into Culhuacan's culture and their warriors provided mercenaries for its wars.

The Mexica tlatoani Acamapichtli was a grandson of Coxcoxtli. Nevertheless, in 1377 Azcapotzalco subdued Culhuacán in large part with Aztec troops, causing many of the Culhua to seek refuge in Acolhuacan, Azcapotzalco, and Cuauhtitlan. In 1428, the Mexica tlatoani Itzcóatl helped to overthrow Azcapotzalco's hegemony, and accepted the title "Ruler of the Culhua".

== Tlahtohqueh Cōlhuahcān (Colhuacan's rulers) ==
- Huehue Topiltzin Nauhyotzin 717–763
- Nonohualcatl I 763–845
- Yohuallatonac 845–904
- Quetzalacxoyatzin 904–953
- Chalchiuhtlatonac 953–985
- Totepeuh 985–1026
- Nauhyotzin II 1026–1072
- Cuauhtexpetlatzin 1072–1129
- Nonohualcatl II 1130–1150
- Achitomecatl 1151–1171
- Cuauhtlatonac 1172–1185

(Chichimeca dynasty)

- Mallatzin 1186–1200
- Cuauhtlahtolloc (caudillaje) 1200–1235
- Chalchiuhtlatonac II 1235–1245
- Cuauhtlix 1245–1252
- Yohuallatonac Telpochtli 1252–1259
- Tziuhtecatl 1260–1269
- Xihuitltemoc 1269–1281
- Coxcoxtli 1281–1307
- Cuauhtlahtolloc (caudillaje) 1307–1323
- Huehue Acamapichtli 1323–1336
- Achitomecatl Teomecatl II 1336–1347
- Nauhyotl Teuctli Tlamacazqui (Nauhyotzin III) 1347–1413
- Acoltzin 1413–1429
- Itzcoatl 1429–1440 (Tepaneca ruler under Maxtla)
- Xilomantzin 1440–1473
- Tlatolcatzin 1473–1482
- Tezozomoctli 1482–1521

== See also ==
- Aztecs
- Pueblo Culhuacán
