= Aubin Codex =

Aztec textual and pictorial history book

- British Museum
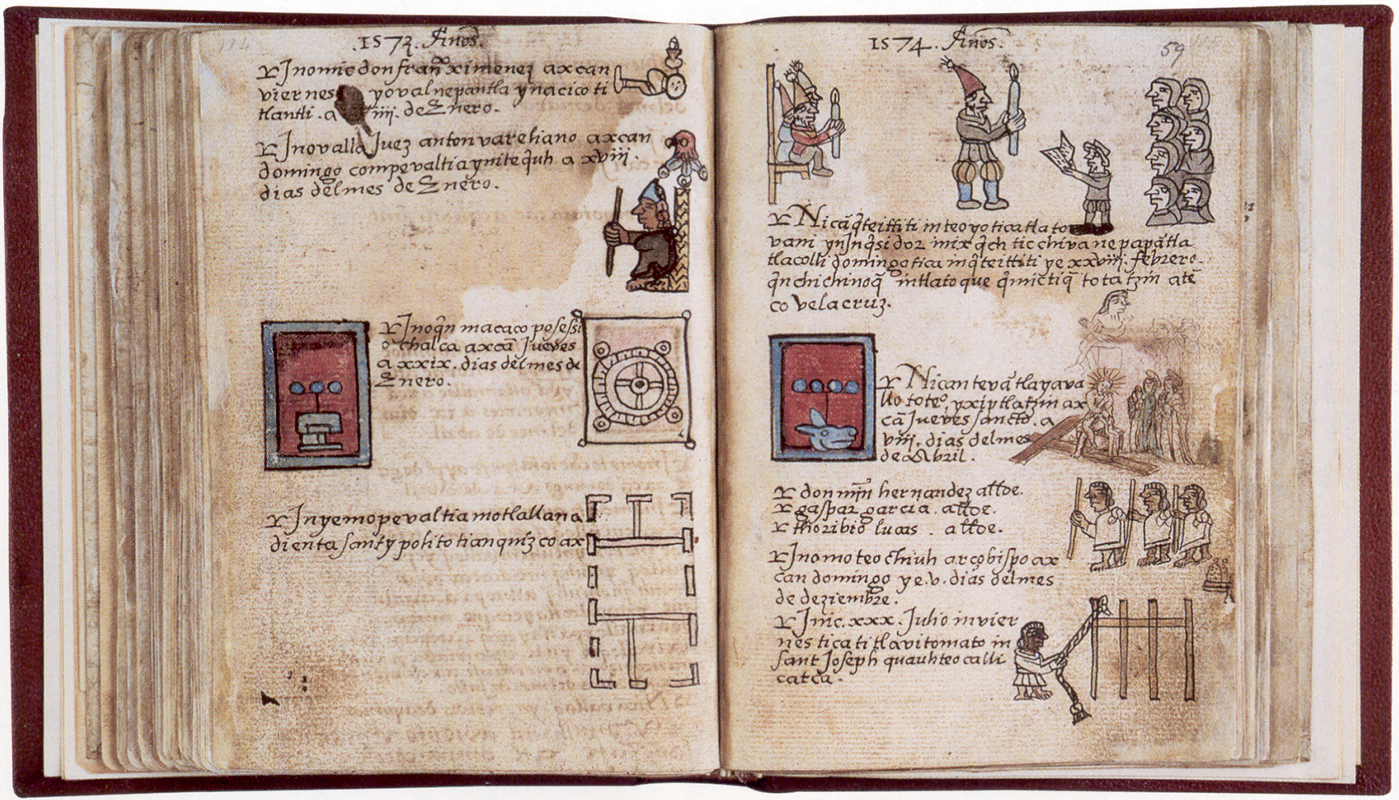
- Folio 59 of the Aubin Codex
- Type: Aztec codex
- Date: 1576-1607
- Place of origin: Mexico
- Language: Nahuatl
- Author(s): unknown, alleged supervision of Diego Durán
- Dedicated to: history of Mexico
- Material: bark paper
- Format: screenfold book
- Script: Aztec Hieroglyphs

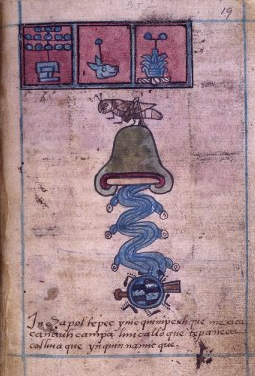
Right side of Folio 19

The Aubin Codex is an 81-leaf Aztec codex written in alphabetic Nahuatl on paper from Europe. Its textual and pictorial contents represent the history of the Aztec peoples who fled Aztlán, lived during the Spanish conquest of the Aztec Empire, and into the early Spanish colonial period, ending in 1608. It is now in the British Museum in London.

== History ==
The Codex covers the history of Mexico between 1168–1607. The first date written in the manuscript is 1576, on the frontispiece. The latest date written is 1607. It appears that various Nahuatl-speaking authors worked on it over that time.

It is not known where the codex was during most of the 17th century, or indeed until Italian historian and ethnographer of the New World, Lorenzo Boturini Benaduci, added it to his collection in the mid-18th century. His collection was impounded by Spanish authorities after he was arrested in 1744 for entering New Spain without license.

In the early 19th century, the codex was acquired from whereabouts unknown by Joseph Marius Alexis Aubin, a French Americanist and collector, whose name the codex now bears. Somehow the codex ended up in the collection of a French bookseller living in London, Jules Des Portes. Des Portes sold the codex to the British Museum in 1880, in amongst another 300 or so objects over the course of their commercial relationship. Aubin published a lithographic reproduction in 1893.

The manuscript was hand-copied and partially translated numerous times in the nineteenth and twentieth centuries; many of these copies are in collections in Europe and Mexico.

== Contents ==
The Aubin Codex is two manuscripts, bound together as one. The first is an annals account of the Mexica of Tenochtitlan, beginning with their migration out of Aztlan in the year 1 Flint, correlated to 1168 in the manuscript. It includes the foundation of Tenochtitlan, and the cataclysmic events of the conquest-era, including the smallpox epidemic after the arrival of the conquistadors, and the massacre at the temple in Tenochtitlan in 1520. James Lockhart has published an English translation of the Codex Aubin's Nahuatl account of the conquest of the Aztec Empire. According to Lockhart, internal evidence suggests that the main author was a man from the Mexico-Tenochtitlan sector of San Juan Moyotlan, who drew on existing material, including oral sources, for his account of the earlier era, and then began an eyewitness account of the events of the late sixteenth century. Unlike the account of the conquest of the Aztec Empire in the Florentine Codex, which is primarily from the Tlatelocan viewpoint and denigrates the Mexica of Tenochtitlan, Codex Aubin offers the Mexica perspective and makes no reference to events in Tlatelolco.

== Style ==
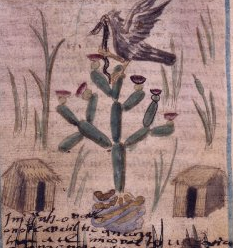
Detail of folio 26, showing the foundation of Tenochtitlan, as an eagle, the avatar of the deity Huitzilopochtli, landed on a nopal cactus with a snake in its beak

The Codex Aubin is written in mixed pictographic-alphabetic format, and a number of painters and writers worked on it. The first part of the Codex Aubin, consisting of the Mexica migration history from Aztlan to Tenochtitlan, is written in clustered annals structure. Years, represented by hieroglyphs in square cartouches, are grouped in rows or columns, these year blocks allowing more space for a longer alphabetic text. The years are written from left to right and top to bottom. The next part of the codex, covering the period after the foundation of Tenochtitlan, is written in a more conventional annals structure, with a vertical block of five years on each page, and a record of corresponding events, rendered with images and alphabetic text. From 1553 to 1591 (fol. 48v-67v), each page is devoted to the events of a single year. The last part of the codex was originally a separate manuscript, and lists the native rulers of Tenochtitlan from its founding until 1608.

== Present status ==
Also called Manuscrito de 1576 ('Manuscript of 1576'), the codex is in the British Museum in London. A copy is held at the Princeton University Library in the Robert Garrett Collection. As of 2015, Fordham University has been hosting a project to translate the codex into English and further decipher its images and pictographs.
