= Chimalpahin =

Nahua annalist from Chalco

Domingo Francisco de San Antón Muñón Chimalpahin Quauhtlehuanitzin (1579, Amecameca, Chalco – 1660, Mexico City), usually referred to simply as Chimalpahin or Chimalpain, was a Nahua annalist from Chalco. His Nahuatl names (Nahuatl pronunciation: [tʃiːmaɬˈpaː.in kʷaːʍtɬeːwaˈnitsin]) mean "Runs Swiftly with a Shield" and "Rising Eagle", respectively, and he claimed descent from the lords of Tenango-Amecameca-Chalco. He was the grandson of the late Don Domingo Hernández Ayopochtzin, a seventh-generation descendant of the founding king of the polity. Don Domingo was learned and esteemed, especially for his education and his record-keeping skills in the ancient tradition.

He wrote on the history of Mexico and other neighboring nations in the Nahuatl and Spanish languages. The most important of his surviving works is the Relaciones or Anales. This Nahuatl work was compiled in the early seventeenth century, and is based on testimony from indigenous people. It covers the years 1589 through 1615, but also deals with events before the conquest and supplies lists of indigenous kings and lords and Spanish viceroys, archbishops of Mexico and inquisitors. Chimalpahin recorded the 1610 and 1614 visits of Japanese delegations to Mexico, led by Tanaka Shōsuke and Hasekura Tsunenaga, respectively. He recorded brawls between the Japanese and Spaniards, in one of which the Spanish ambassador Sebastián Vizcaíno was severely wounded in Acapulco in the year 1614.

He also wrote Diferentes historias originales (also known as Relaciones originales), a compilation of claims and proofs of nobility asserted by indigenous leaders of Chalco-Amequemecan. It was written to serve as a judicial guide for the viceregal authorities for the granting of privileges and offices to members of the indigenous nobility. There are eight of these relaciones. All contain ethnographic, social and chronologic information of great value to historians.

His manuscripts came into the possession of Carlos de Sigüenza y Góngora. For an account of what happened to these documents after the death of Sigüenza, see Lorenzo Boturini Benaducci.
