= Tozcuecuextli =

13th-century Aztec politician

- Cuauhtlahto of the Mexitli
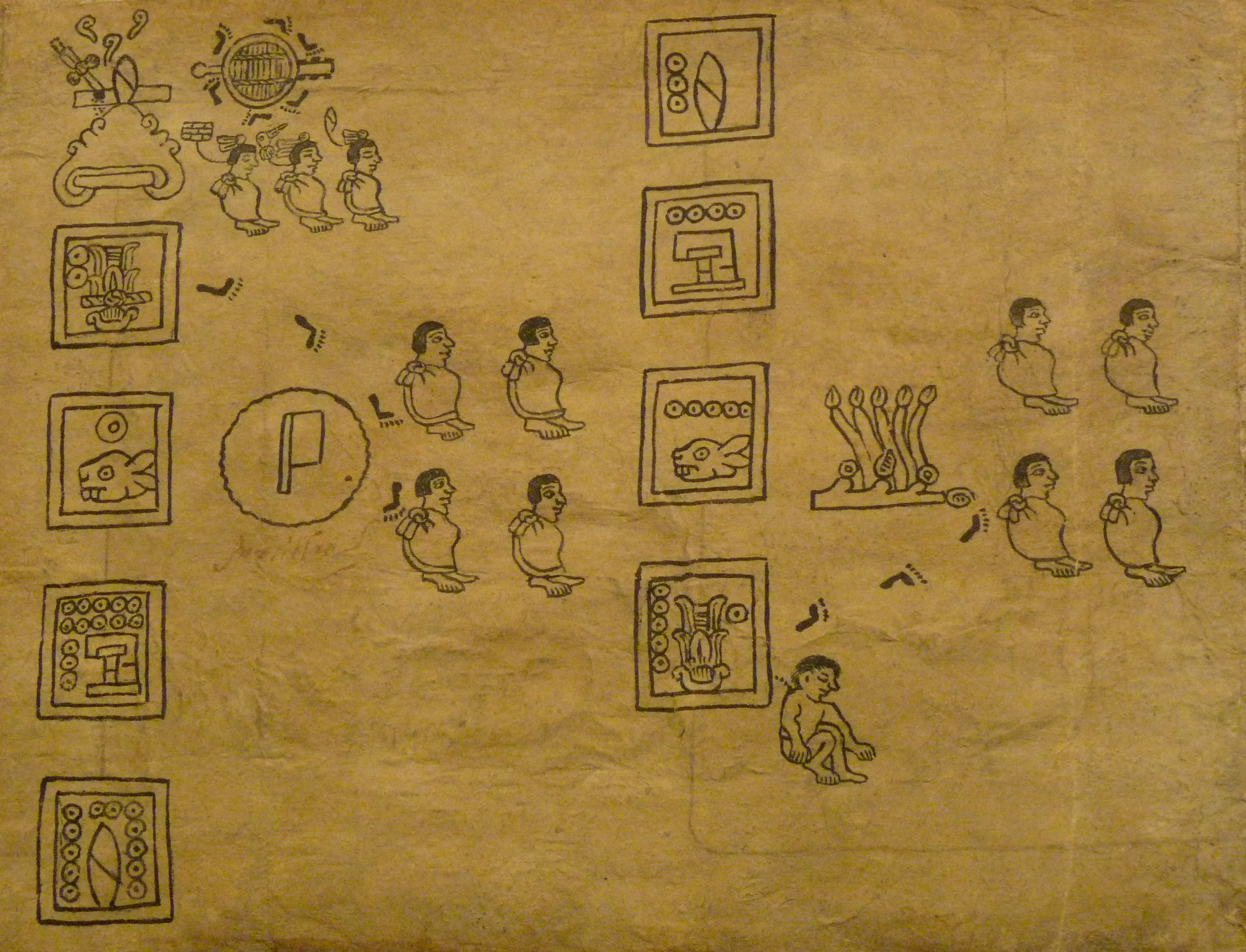
- From Codex Boturini (also known as Tira de la peregrinación), folio 15
- Reign: 1239–1278
- Predecessor: Iztacmixcoatl / Tlazotzin
- Successor: Huehue Huitzilihuitl
- Born: c. 1200
- Died: 1278; Tenochtitlan
- Spouse: Tlaquilxochitzin

Tozcuecuextli (c. 1200 – 1272) was a political figure in the Aztec Empire.

== Life ==
Tozcuecuextli was born in the surroundings of Xaltocan. His father, Iztacmixcoatzin, is considered the origin of the Nahuatlacas and the Mexica. He was educated within a calpulli (neighborhood) of builders.

In 1226, he married Tlaquilxochitzin, princess of Tzompanco, with whom he fathered Huitzilihuitl I, his successor, the following year.

Upon the death of Iztacmixcoatzin in 1233 or 1239, Tozcuecuextli took command and shortly after, at the suggestion of Huitziltzin, he emigrated to the Sierra de Guadalupe to exploit the forest and the andesite deposits, near the shore of Lake Texcoco, south of Ecatepec, across the lagoon in canoes they transport material more efficiently and continually do work for Azcapotzalco and its dependent towns, without forgetting to do the same with the lordship of Tenayocan. They asked for permission to found their first capital in 1240, Huixachtitlan.

In 1245, Tlotzin launched himself against Colhuacan and defeated them with the help of Tozcuecuextli. Marital alliances were also established, which in the long run would give rise to the last Colhua lineage and the second Mexica (the first was Xaltocamecatl).

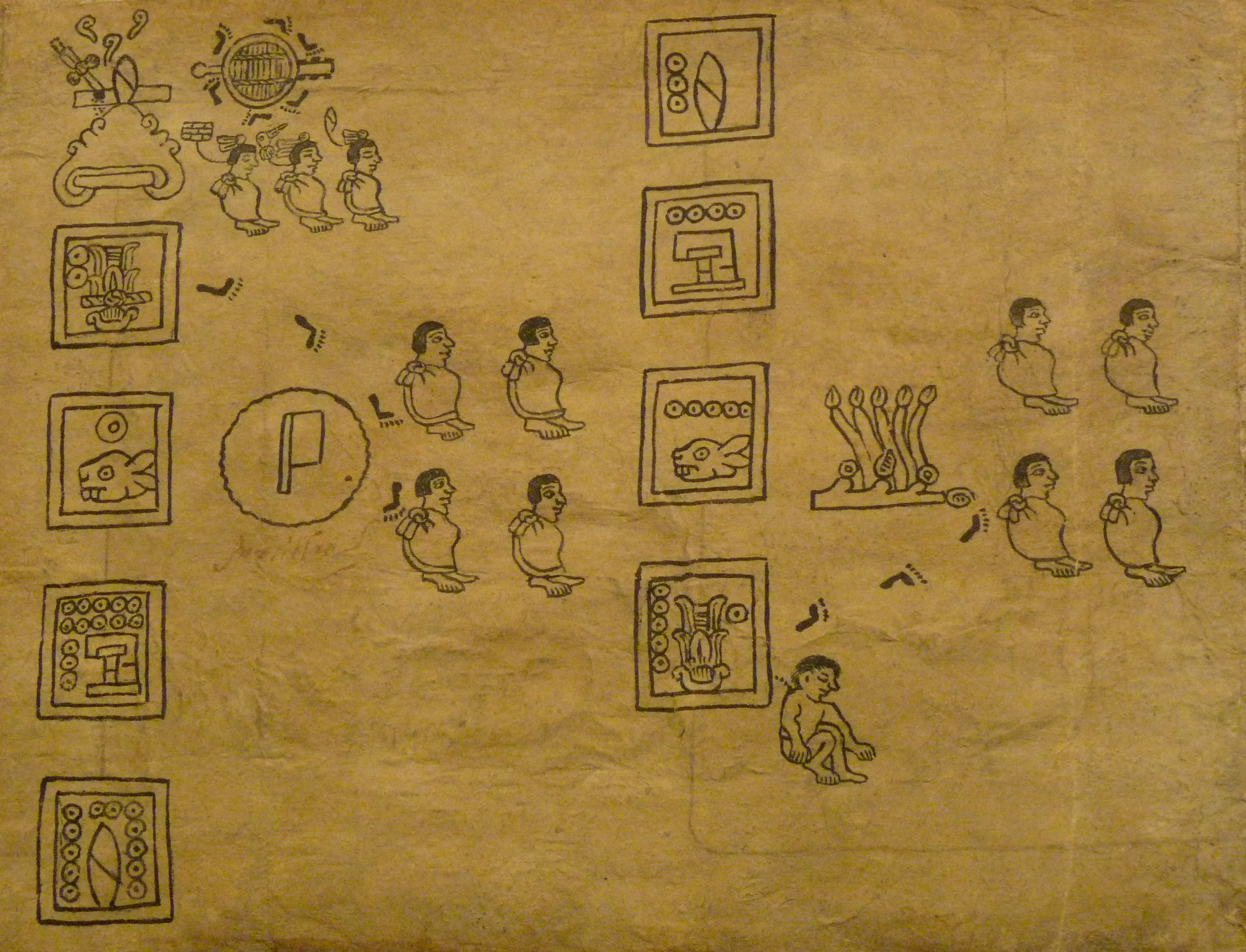
Boturini Codex, in the upper left corner you can see the three relevant characters who participated in the Tecpayocan war: Tetepantzin, Huitziltzin and Tecpatzin. Below them you can see the place name of Pantitlán.

Pantitlán also exploits the Sierra de Guadalupe, so at a certain point their interests lead them to war against Huixachtitlan, the final battle taking place near Tecpayocan, the Mexitin win but Tecpatzin dies. Also shortly after Huitziltzin died, Tozcuecuextli ordered that his remains be transformed into tlaquimilolli (sacred wrapping) and they gave him the name Huitzilopochtli.

Tozcuecuextli continued to rule, and his new right arm Huehue Cuauhtlequetzqui (father of Cuauhtlequetzqui of 1281) supported him until his death in 1272. He died in Tlachco.
