= List of rulers of Tlatelolco =

This is a list of the tlatoque of the pre-Columbian era altepetl of Tlatelolco.

== Pre-Hispanic rulers ==
Tlatoani	Picture	Birth	Death	Notes
Quaquapitzahuac; 2 Reed (1403) – 4 Rabbit (1418)		Son of Tezozomoc of Azcapotzalco	4 Rabbit (1418)	His wife was Acxocueitl.
Tlacateotl; 13 Lizard; 4 Rabbit (1418) – 12 Rabbit (1426)		Son of Quaquapitzahuac	12 Rabbit (1426); Atzompan; Killed by the Acolhua	His wife was his aunt Xiuhcanahualtzin.
Quauhtlatoa; 1 Vulture; 1 Flint (1428) – 4 Reed (1431)/7 Flint (1460)/8 House (1461)		Son of Acolmiztli	4 Reed (1431)/7 Flint (1460)/8 House (1461); Killed by the Tenochca	
Moquihuix; 13 Monkey; 7 Flint (1460) – 7 House (1473)		Married to Chalchiuhnenetzin, younger sister of the Tenochca ruler Axayacatl,	7 House (1473); Killed by the Tenochca	Installed by Moctezuma I and Axayacatl of Tenochtitlan.
Itzquauhtzin; 9 Reed (1475) – 2 Flint (1520)		Son of Tlacateotl	2 Flint (1520); Killed by the Spaniards	A cuauhtlatoani (interim ruler). Installed by Axayacatl of Tenochtitlan.

== Colonial rulers ==
Tlatoani	Picture	Birth	Death	Notes
Diego de Mendoza; 4 House (1549) – 5 Rabbit (1562)		Son of Zayoltzin	20 December; 5 Rabbit (1562)	
Miguel García Oquiztzin; 10 Reed (1567) – 9 Reed (1579)			9 Reed (1579)	

== See also ==
- List of tlatoque of Tenochtitlan
- List of tlatoque of Tetzcoco
- Family tree of Aztec monarchs
- Aztec Empire

== Notes ==
=== References ===
- Chimalpahin Cuauhtlehuanitzin, Domingo Francisco de San Antón Muñón (1997). Codex Chimalpahin: society and politics in Mexico Tenochtitlan, Tlatelolco, Texcoco, Culhuacan, and other Nahua altepetl in central Mexico: the Nahuatl and Spanish annals and accounts collected and recorded by don Domingo de San Antón Muñón Chimalpahin Quauhtlehuanitzin. The Civilization of the American Indian Series. edited and translated by Arthur J. O. Anderson and Susan Schroeder. Norman: University of Oklahoma Press. ISBN 0-8061-2921-2.
