= Moquihuix =

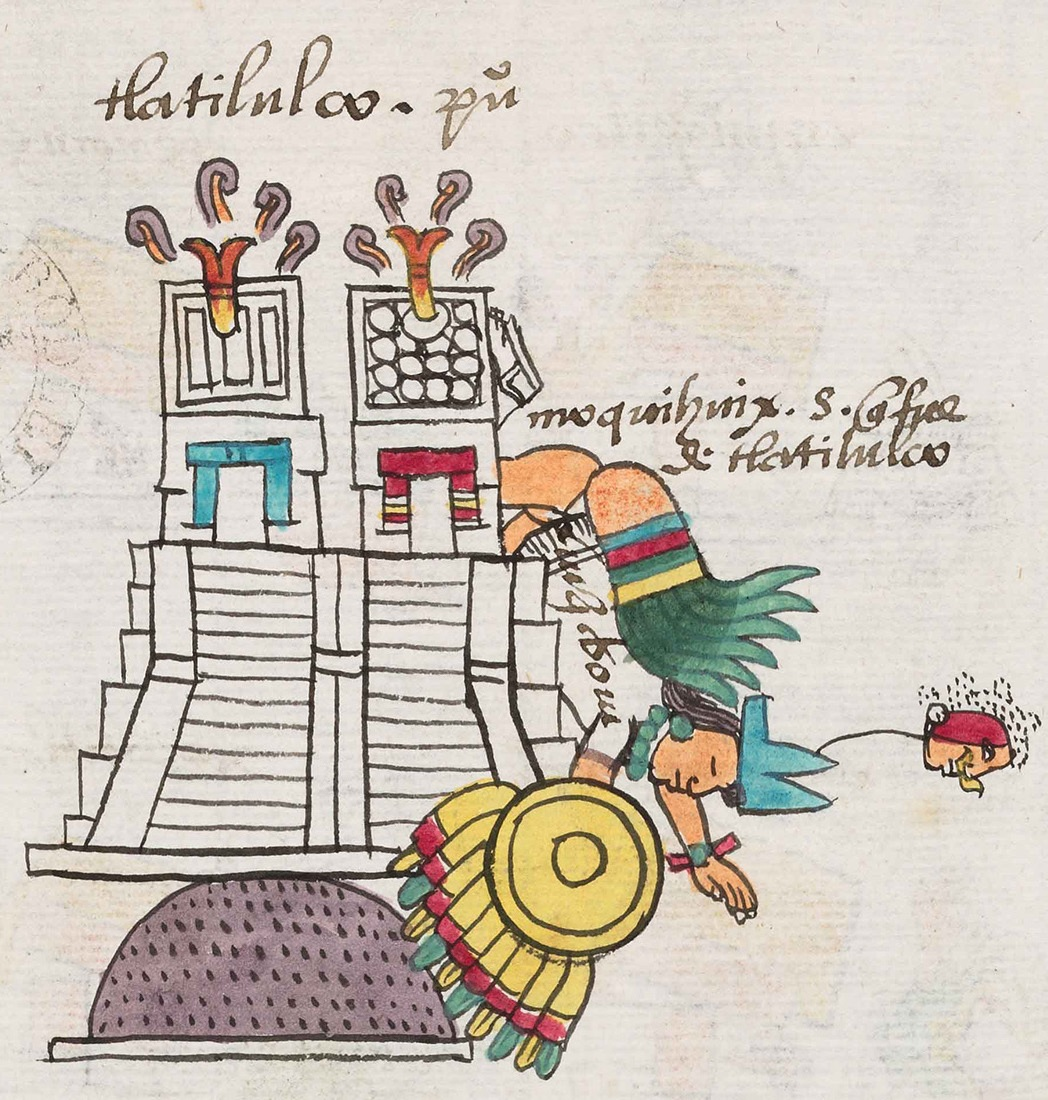
- Moquihuix's death as depicted in the Codex Mendoza.

Tlatoani of Tlatelolco
- Reign: 1460 – 1473
- Predecessor: Quauhtlatoa
- Successor: Itzquauhtzin
- Died: 1473
- Spouse: Chalchiuhnenetzin
- Issue: Axayaca; Tzihuacpopoca

Moquihuix (or Moquihuixtli) (died 1473) was the fourth tlatoani (ruler) of Tlatelolco. He died in 1473 in the Battle of Tlatelolco, a military conflict fought between Tlatelolco and Tenochtitlan.

Moquihuix was married to Chalchiuhnenetzin, younger sister of the Tenochca ruler Axayacatl, after whom their son Axayaca was named. However, it is said that Moquihuix did not like her, refusing to sleep with her and redistributed the gifts Axayacatl had married to his secondary wives. When Axayacatl learned of this, he grew furious and attacked Moquihuix's territory.

A funerary urn that may belong to Moquihuix was found in 1978 at the site of the Templo Mayor of Tenochtitlan, near the Coyolxauhqui Stone.

== Notes ==
Regnal titles
Preceded by Quauhtlatoa	Tlatoani of Tlatelolco; 1460–1473	Succeeded by Itzquauhtzin as quauhtlatoani
