= Cuauhtlequetzqui =

Aztec name

- Cuauhtlahto of the Mexitli
- Reign: 1116–1153
- Successor: Acacihtli

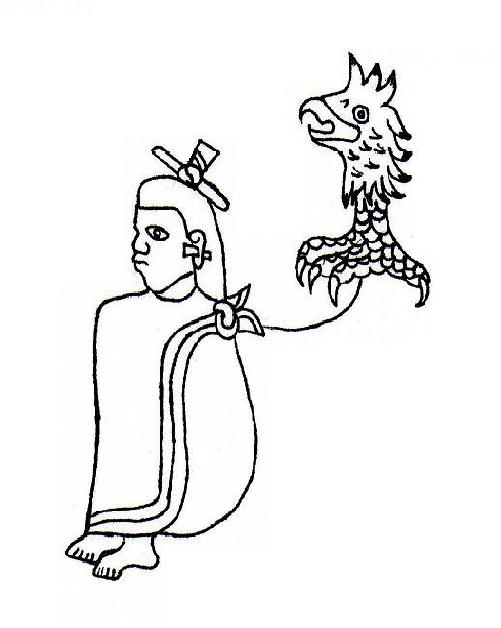

Cuauhtlequetzqui or Cuauhtliquetzqui is an Aztec name meaning rising eagle and used by several historical people.

The most important of the people with this name was born between 1250 and 1260, his father also was called Cuauhtlequetzqui, a fact that has caused some confusion. In addition, this personage is projected further into the past, making him the first cuauhtlahto (Mexica leader) "to set out" from Aztlan, Chimalpain places him as ruler from 1116-1153, and even says that he is the same person mentioned from 1280 AD onward.

His historical participation is extensively mythologised, his first action is in the war against the Texcaltepeca-Malinalcas in 1281, when, as war-leader, he distinguished himself by capturing Copil, the enemy leader, and taking his daughter, Xicomoyahual, to marry. From this union Cohuatzontli was born. With the failure at Chapoltepec in 1281, the myth came to symbolise the foundation of the site, with the legend becoming the justification for Tenochca domination over other peoples, as well as aligning them theologically with the Matalazincas.

With the victory in Chapoltepec, Cuauhtlequetzqui was named lord there. He only ruled for five years, being killed in the final battle when the warriors of Teotenanco tried, unsuccessfully, to recapture the area of the forest.

== Development of important moments ==
Its historical participation is excessively mythologized. His first intervention was as captain general in the war against the Texcaltepecas-Malinalcas in 1281, where he stood out by capturing Copil, the rival captain, and taking his wife Xicomoyahualtzin from whom Cohuatzontli was born.

In the myth, it is mentioned that Copil is the son of Malinalxoch, sister of Huitzilopochtli. This woman was dishonorably abandoned in Malinalco and swore revenge through her son. But, upon failing at the siege of Chapoltepec (1281), Copil's campaign became the seed of the founding symbol, so the myth would have the function of legitimizing the rights of the Tenochcas over other peoples in addition to linking "theogonically" with the Matlatzincas.

With the victory at Chapoltepec, Cuauhtlehquetzqui was named lord of the place and the Mexitin achieved their own Excan Tlahtoloyan (triple alliance or confederation) between Huixachtitlan-Cuauhmixtitlan- Chapoltepec.

Cuauhtlequetzqui only ruled for five years, as those from Teotenanco tried to recover the Chapoltepec forest area in 1285. The invaders were repelled, however, the leader died in the final battle.
