= Acacitli =

Cofounder of Aztec city Tenochtitlan

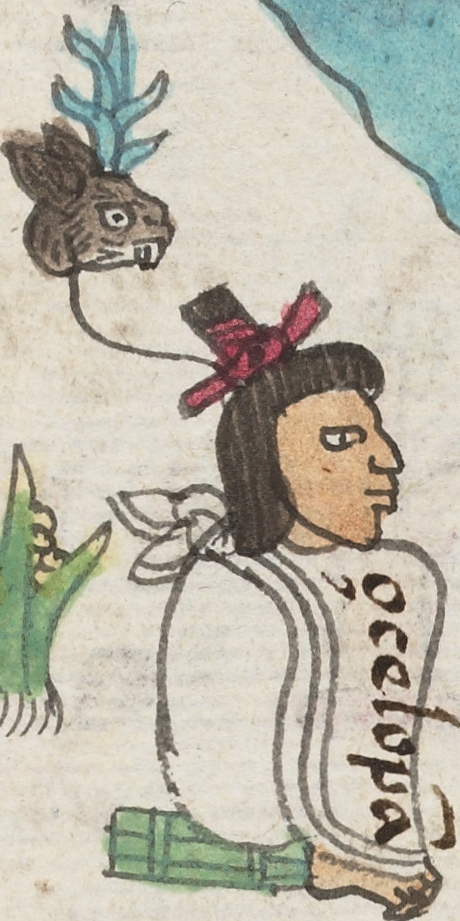
- Acacitli (mislabelled as Ocelopan) with his name glyph in the Codex Mendoza.
- Died: 1167; Tulpetlac
- Predecessor: Cuauhtlequetzqui
- Successor: Citlallitzin
- Children: Queen Tezcatlan Miyahuatzin
- Relatives: Huitzilihuitl (grandson)

Acacitli (Nahuatl for "reed hare"; pronounced [aːkaˈsiʔtɬi]) was a Mexica chief and one of the "founding fathers" of Tenochtitlan, the capital of the Aztec Empire.

According to the Crónica mexicayotl, his daughter Tezcatlan Miyahuatzin was married to Acamapichtli, the first tlatoani of Tenochtitlan, and gave birth to King Huitzilihuitl.

== The cuauhtlatoani ==
=== Temporality ===
The two main versions that expose its temporality come from the same historian: Domingo Chimalpahin, deposited at the Memorial of Colhuacan, The original title of this section of the Différentes histoires originals (Ms. Mex. 74-BnF) that succeeds the Second Relation and precedes the Third Relation is "Brief Memorial on the Foundation of the City of Culhuacan" (in the original fol. 15r: Memorial breue sobre la fundaçiô de la ciudad de Culhuacan), so it is an abbreviation. the Seventh Relation, and the Journal respectively.

The Memorial de Colhuacan shares (and complements) its conclusions with the Seventh relation, for they establish that there were nine cuauhtlahtohqueh ('interim leader/ruler') who guided to the Mexica from 1116 (1-Tecpatl) comparing computations with the beginning of the migration presented in the Codex Boturini to 1312 (2-tecpatl) To try to give more historical depth to the facts, although the Memorial of Colhuacan creates a kind of "lagoon" equivalent to a New Fire Ceremony, 52 years (from 1188 to 1240) This creates confusion considering that lately, there have been attempts to spread connections between the indigenous calendar and symbology from a Western vision that leave aside the original conception recorded in the sources. According to this version, he was the third cuauhtlahto who became cuauhtlahto in the year 12-house and died in the year 13-caña. If so, he ruled for 15 years; settling seventeen years after his arrival in Tula in 1153 and died four years after his arrival in Atlitlalaquian in 1167.

On the other hand, the Journal provides a clearer and more coherent list based on older sources calculating in the Indigenous way, from which the inconsistencies of the periods of the other lists are observed and studied. In the same manner as the previous list, he was converted cuauhtlahto in the year 12-house and died in 13-cane, governing for 15 years. The account of the tonalpohualli might certainly seem the same, but it is not. This list advocates placing 12-house in 1205 and 13-cane in 1219, that is, 52 years later.

The Annals of Tlatelolco present a different list that does not clear up the problem in its entirety, taking into account that Rafael Tena (translator and paleographer of the edition of CONACULTA in 2004) proposed an incorrect chronology, but agrees that there were nine cuauhtlahtohqueh. Starting from the year 8-casa 1253 and going back to the year 1-acatl 1155, he was placed as successor of Cuauhtlequetzqui in 1205 (12-casa) established in Tlemaco to Apanteuctli, who replaced Acacitli until his death in 1236 (4-tecpatl) in Apazco.

It is also useful to mention that it is preferable to bring the cuauhtlahtohqueh in the historically true since 1240; First, the sources themselves indicate events that are excessively mythologized, incoherent, contradictory and not very corroborable in reality.

== See also ==
- List of Tenochtitlan rulers
