= Diego Mendoza (disambiguation) =

Diego Mendoza, or de Mendoza, may refer to:

- Diego Mendoza (born 1992), Argentine footballer
- Diego de Mendoza (1549–1562), Aztec Empire tlatoani or king
- Diego de Becerra-Mendoza (died 1533), Spanish captain murdered by mutineer Fortún Ximénez
