= Copil =

Copil (Romanian: child) is a Romanian surname. Notable people with the surname include:

- Dumitru Copil (born 1990), Romanian footballer
- Marius Copil (born 1990), Romanian tennis player

== See also ==
- Alerta Răpire Copil, child abduction alert system in Romania.
- Copil (son of Malinalxochitl), mythical child of the Aztec goddess Malinalxochitl.
