= Malinalxochitl =

Aztec deity

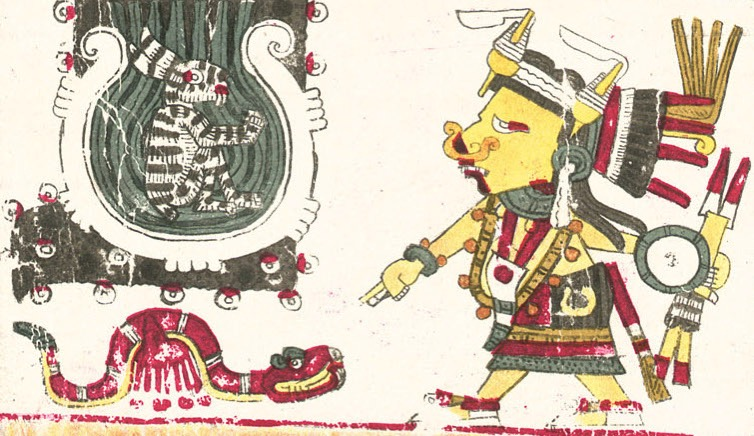
- Gender: female

In Aztec mythology, Malinalxochitl, or Malīnalxōch, (Classical Nahuatl: Malīnalxōchitl [maliːnaɬˈʃoːtʃitɬ], from Nahuatl malinalli "grass" and xochitl "flower") was a sorceress and goddess of snakes, scorpions, and insects of the desert. She claimed the title Cihuacoatl, meaning "Woman Serpent" or "Snake Woman". Her brother was Huītzilōpōchtli. During the migration, she was abandoned during her sleep by the Mexicas as directed by her brother. Afterward she had a son named Copil with Chimalcuauhtli, king of Malinalco.

== See also ==
- List of Aztec deities

== Bibliography ==
- Bahr, Donald M. (2004). "Temptation and Glory in One Pima and Two Aztec Mythologies". Journal of the Southwest. 46 (4): 705–761. ISSN 0894-8410. JSTOR 40170283.
- Diel, Lori Boornazian (2005). "Women and Political Power: The Inclusion and Exclusion of Noblewomen in Aztec Pictorial Histories". RES: Anthropology and Aesthetics (47): 96. ISSN 0277-1322. JSTOR 20167660.
- Heyden, Doris; Czitrom, Carolyn Baus (1997). "Los Insectos en el Arte Prehispanico". Artes de México (11): 37. ISSN 0300-4953. JSTOR 24326879.
- Hyde, Virginia; Clark, L.D. (1993). "The Sense of an Ending in "The Plumed Serpent"". The D. H. Lawrence Review. 25 (1/3): 143. ISSN 0011-4936. JSTOR 44235484.
- Hyde, Virginia (1995). "Kate and the Goddess: Subtexts in "The Plumed Serpent"". The D. H. Lawrence Review. 26 (1/3): 258. ISSN 0011-4936. JSTOR 44235550.
- Martín del Campo, Edgar (2009). "The Global Making of a Mexican Vampire: Mesoamerican, European, African, and Twentieth-Century Media Influences on the Teyollohcuani". History of Religions. 49 (2): 122. doi:10.1086/649523. ISSN 0018-2710. JSTOR 10.1086/649523. S2CID 224808347.
- Roskamp, Hans (2010). "LOS NAHUAS DE TZINTZUNTZAN-HUITZITZILAN, MICHOACÁN. HISTORIA, MITO Y LEGITIMACIÓN DE UN SEÑORÍO PREHISPÁNICO". Journal de la Société des américanistes. 96 (1): 75–106. doi:10.4000/jsa.11264. ISSN 0037-9174. JSTOR 24606437.
