= Mexitli =

Aztec figure

In Aztec mythology, Mexitli (Spanish: [meˈʃitli]) is a deity who was sometimes identified with the war god Huītzilōpōchtli. "Mexitli" is described by some sources as an alternative name of Huītzilōpōchtli, or as the origin of the name "Mexicans". One scholar believes that Mexitli was originally an earth deity of the Mexican people before their founding of Tenochtitlan, and another views him as a leader of the early Mexicans who was identified with Huītzilōpōchtli.

== Sources ==
In the Historia de los Indios de la Nueva España of Toribio de Benavente (1482–1565), Mexitli is described as the chief Aztec deity, from whom the words "Mexico" and "Mexicans" are derived, also known by the name "Texatlicupa". In his Memoriales, Benavente uses "Mexitli" as an alternative name for Huītzilōpōchtli; according to Doris Heyden, in doing so he identifies Mexitli, Huītzilōpōchtli, and Tezcatlipoca. Fray Juan de Torquemada (c. 1562–1624), in his Monarquía indiana, also writes that "Mexitli" was another name for Huītzilōpōchtli, interpreting the former as "the navel of the maguey". Francisco Javier Clavijero (1731–1787) derives the name of the Mexicans from Mexitli, and – according to Christian Duverger – interprets him as "a kind of cryptonym for the Aztec tribal god". The Nahuatl text which contains the Leyenda de los Soles ('Legend of the Suns') instead describes Meçitli as female earth deity, who rears the young Mixcoa.

== Interpretation ==
Rudolf van Zantwijk believes that Huītzilōpōchtli was originally a Toltec god, and was not worshipped by the early Mexican people until their founding of Tenochtitlan; he sees Mexitli, whom he describes as a god of the earth, as one of their deities prior to the adoption of Huītzilōpōchtli. After this early period, he considers Mexitli to be Huītzilōpōchtli in the form of an earth deity.

According to Javier Rondero, Mexitli was the leader of the Mexicans during their migration to Mexico, also known as Mexi and Mixi, who was deified and assimilated to Huītzilōpōchtli in the region of Michoacán. He sees his name as meaning "the one who kills (with an obsidian arrow)", thereby signifying "the lord of death and war". Gutierre Tibón writes that Mexitli was an eponymous, mythical hero who was equated with Huītzilōpōchtli, comparing this to the identification of Romulus with the deity Quirinus.
