= Quauhtlatoa =

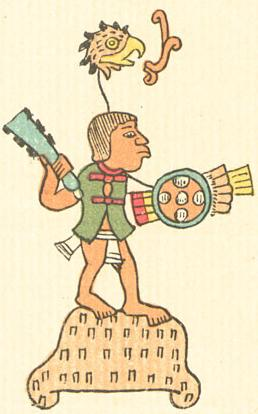
- King Quauhtlatoa

Tlatoani of Tlatelolco
- Predecessor: Tlacateotl
- Successor: Moquihuix
- Father: Prince Acolmiztli of Tlatelolco

Quauhtlatoa (or Cuauhtlatoa) (1 Flint (1428) – 4 Reed (1431)/7 Flint (1460)/8 House (1461)) was a tlatoani (king, ruler) of the Nahua city-state Tlatelolco.

== Biography ==
He was a son of Prince Acolmiztli of Tlatelolco, grandson of the King Tlacateotl and great-grandson of Quaquapitzahuac.

He was a successor of his grandfather and was killed by the Tenochca.

The Annals of Cuauhtitlan (in Bierhorst 1992) give Quauhtlatoa as a father of King Tezozomoctli.
