= Cuauhtlatoani =

Aztec title

Cuāuhtlahtoāni or Cuäuhtlahtoh is a titular office of governorship and political administration, used within certain city-states and provinces among the Aztecs of pre-Columbian central Mexico in the Late Postclassic period. The office of cuauhtlatoani (a Nahuatl word meaning approximately, "the one who speaks like eagle") carried the connotation of "military ruler" or "appointed administrator". During the rise of the Aztec Empire the title was given by the ruling Mexica-Tenochca to the governors they imposed on conquered city-states in central provinces.

A Tlatoani ("the one who speaks") was an independent ruler of an Aztec/Mexica polity (altepetl). Cuauhtlatoani were appointed by a Tlatoani to rule conquered areas or areas whose independence was lost such as the city Tlatelolco following the 1473 CE defeat of its last Tlatoani, Moquihuix, by Tenochtitlan. Tlatelolco was governed by Cuauhtlatoque until the death of Itzquauhtzin in 1520 CE.

The title is also used in some histories compiled in the early post-conquest era, when referring to the (semi-legendary) leaders of the Mexica (the later Aztecs) during their migrations from the north into the Valley of Mexico, before their founding of Tenochtitlan and the subsequent expansion into empire. The early 17th-century Nahua historian Chimalpahin wrote of a succession of cuauhtlatoani office holders during this pre-foundational period:

- Cuauhtlequetzqui (1116-1153)
- Acacihtli (1153-1167)
- Citlalitzin (1167-1182)
- Tzimpantzin (1182-1184)
- Tlazohtzin (1184-1188)
- Iztacmixcoatzin or Iztacmixcohuatl (1188-1233)
- Tozcuecuextli (1233-1272)
