= Coyolxauhqui Stone =

Carved Aztec stone

Coyolxāuhqui Stone
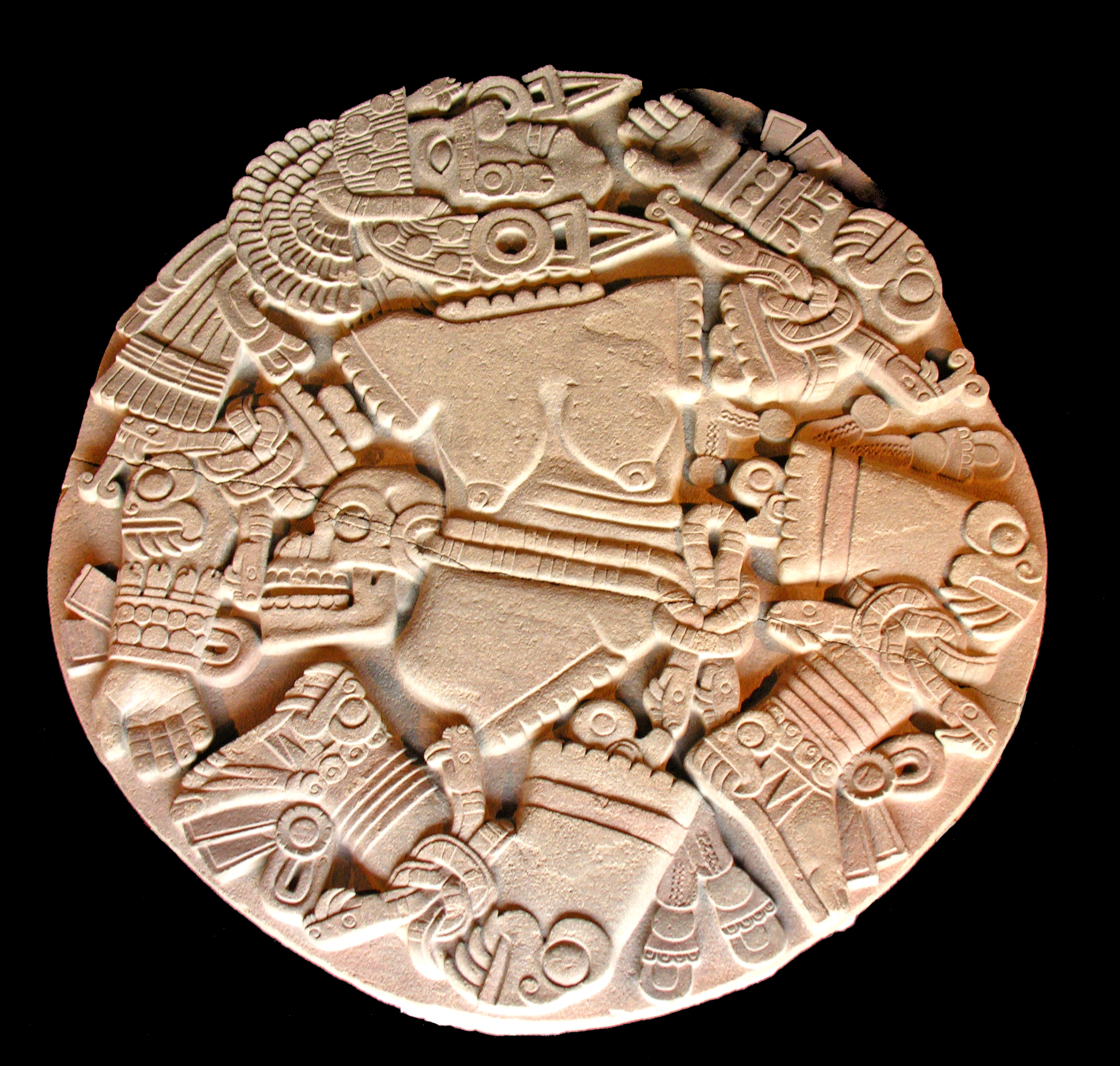
- Size: 3.4 m (10.5 ft) diameter
- Created: c. 1473 CE
- Discovered: February 21, 1978; Templo Mayor site
- Present location: Templo Mayor Museum, Mexico City
- Culture: Aztec

The Coyolxāuhqui Stone is a carved, circular Aztec stone, depicting the mythical being Coyolxāuhqui ("Bells-Her-Cheeks"), in a state of dismemberment and decapitation by her brother, the patron deity of the Aztecs, Huitzilopochtli. It was rediscovered in 1978 at the site of the Templo Mayor of Tenochtitlan, now in Mexico City. This relief is one of the best known Aztec monuments and one of the few great Aztec monuments that have been found fully in situ.

== Discovery ==
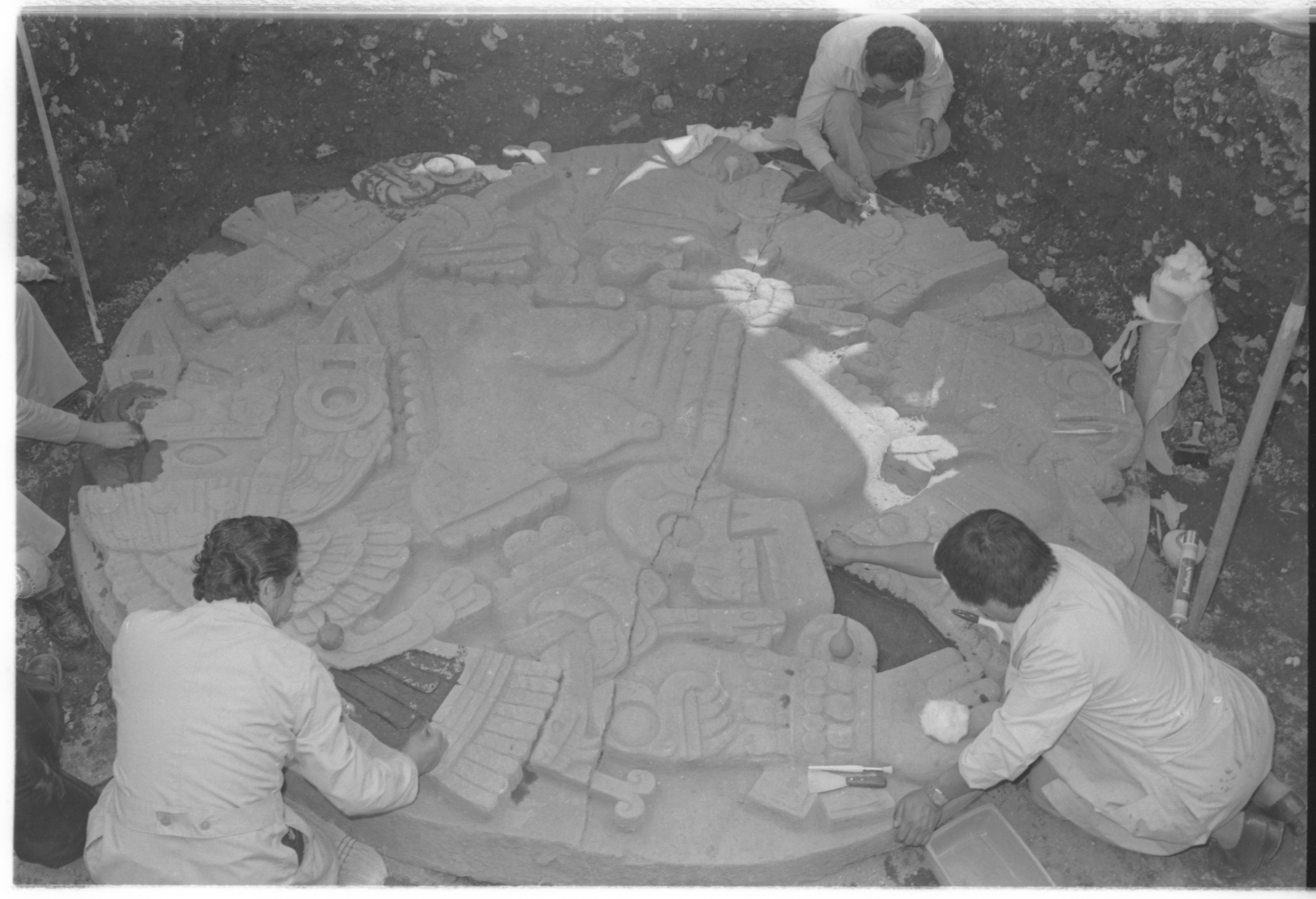
Archaeologists of the Instituto Nacional de Antropología e Historia working at the place where the stone was discovered, 1978.

On February 21, 1978, a group of workers for the Mexico City electric-power company came across a large shield-shaped stone covered in reliefs while digging. The stone they uncovered depicts the narrative of Coyolxauhqui's defeat at Coatepec. The discovery renewed the interest in excavating the ancient city of Tenochtitlan, underneath Mexico City. This led to the excavation of the Templo Mayor, directed by Eduardo Matos Moctezuma.

== Location ==
The Coyolxauhqui stone sat at the base of the stairs of the Huēyi Teōcalli, the primary temple of the Mexica in Tenochtitlan, on the side dedicated to Huitzilopochtli. The temple is dedicated to Huitzilopochtli and Tlaloc, the Aztec rain deity. Scholars believe that Mexica artists and builders incorporated images of the Coatepec narrative into the Huēyi Teōcalli (Templo Mayor) during a major renovation from the years 4 Reed to 8 Reed (1483–1487) under the rule of Ahuitzotl.

At the time of its discovery, the stone laid in the center of a platform that extended from the foot of the stairway. On both sides of the stairway's base, completing the bottom of the stairway's sides, were two large grinning serpent heads and numerous others jutted out from the different walls of the pyramid. Eduardo Matos Moctezuma first noted that the placement of the monument at the bottom of the Templo Mayor commemorated the history of Huitzilopochtli defeating Coyolxauhqui in the battle on Mount Coatepetel. Matos Moctezuma has argued that the section of the Huēyi Teōcalli dedicated to Huitzilopochtli represents the sacred mountain of Coatepec where Huitzilopochtli was born and Coyolxauhqui died.

The Coyolxauhqui stone was located in what was named Phase IV of the Templo Mayor during its excavation.

== Creation ==
The stone was likely created in 1438 under the rule of Axayacatl (1469–1481). The artist of the Coyolxauhqui stone carved this disk in high relief out of a single large stone, 3.25 meters in diameter. Aztec historian Richard Townsend describes it as one of the most powerfully expressive sculptures of Mesoamerican art, using "an assurance of design and a technical virtuosity not previously seen at the pyramids."

== Imagery ==
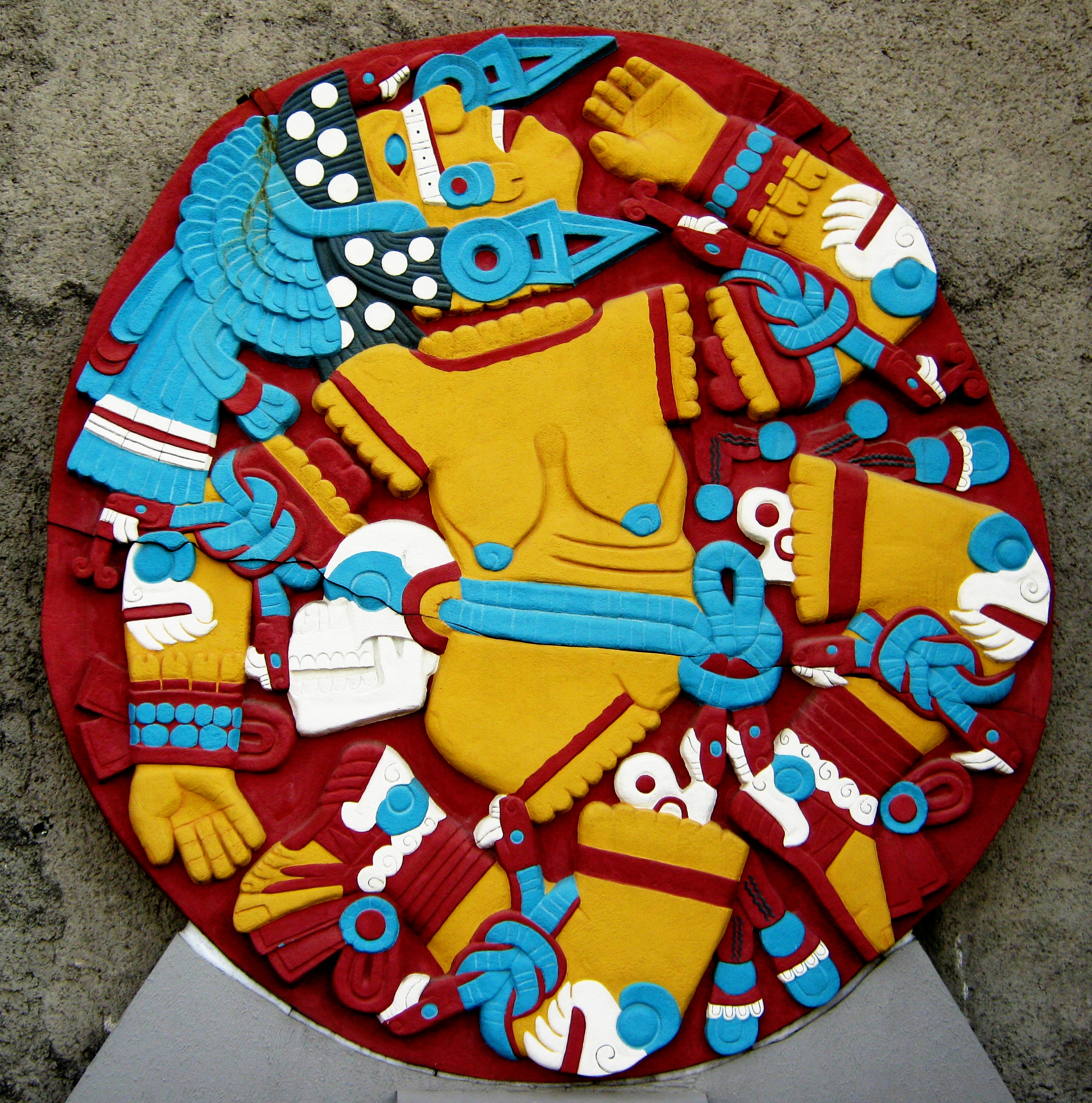
Original coloration of the stone disk, based on chemical traces of pigments.

On the disk, Coyolxāuhqui lies on her back, with her head, arms and legs severed from her body. Her head faces upwards, away from her torso and in profile view, with her mouth open. Her dismembered torso lies flat on her back. Her breasts sag downward. Her body is neatly yet dynamically organized within the circular composition. Scallop-shaped carvings line the points of decapitation and dismemberment at her neck, shoulders, and hip joints. In this representation, Coyolxauhqui is nearly naked, barring her serpent loincloth. Mexica people would have understood this nudity as shameful. She wears only the ritual attire of bells in her hair, a bell symbol on her cheek, and a feathered headdress. These objects identify her as Coyolxauhqui. She wears a skull tied to a belt of snakes around her waist and an ear tab showing the Mexica year sign. Snake, skull, and earth monster imagery surround her.

In the image to the right, which represents the original colors of the stone, Coyolxauhqui's yellow body lies before a red background. Bright blue colors her headdress and various details in the carving. White bones emerge from the scalloped dismembered body parts.

== Role in Sacrifice ==
The Coyolxauhqui stone would have served as a cautionary sign to the enemies of Tenochtitlan. According to Aztec history, female deities such as Coyolxauhqui were the first Aztec enemies to die in war. In this, Coyolxauhqui came to represent all conquered enemies. Her violent death was a warning for the fate of those who crossed the Mexica people. Richard Townsend notes that the disk represented the defeat of the Aztecs' enemies at large.

Sacrificial victims crossed this stone before walking up the stairs of the temple to the block in front of Huitzilopochtli's shrine.

Scholars also believe that the decapitation and destruction of Coyolxauhqui is reflected in the pattern of warrior ritual sacrifice, particularly during the feast of Panquetzaliztli (Banner Raising). The feast takes place in the 15th month of the Aztec calendar and is dedicated to Huitzilopochtli. During the ceremony, captives’ hearts were cut out and their bodies were thrown down the temple stairs to the Coyolxauhqui stone. There, they were decapitated and dismembered, just as Coyolxauhqui was by Huitzilopochtli on Coatepec.

External videos
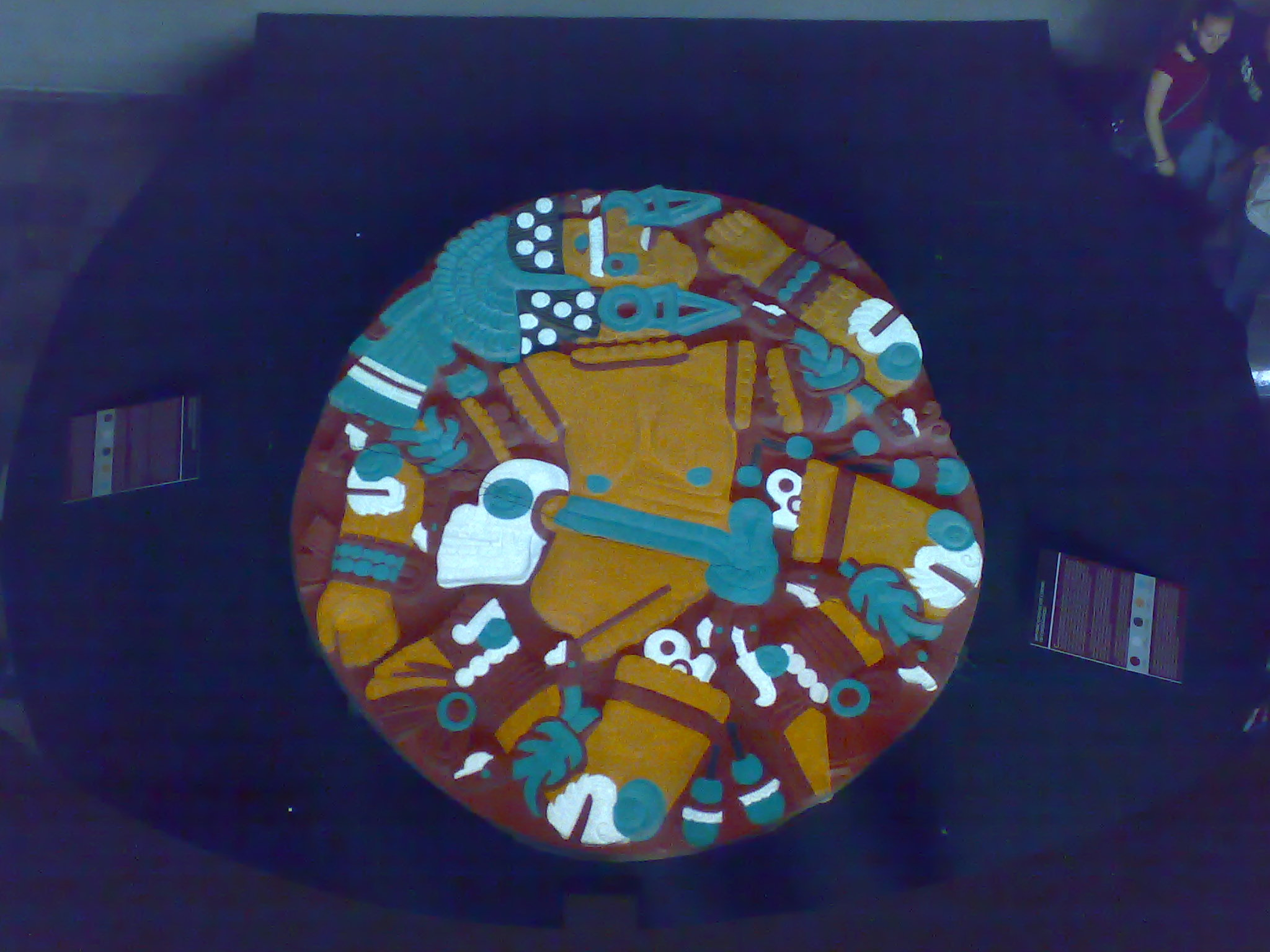
- Coyolxauhqui Monolith, c. 1500 from Smarthistory
