= Diego de Mendoza =

Mexican politician

Glyph for Tlatelolco

Diego de Mendoza (4 House (1549) – 5 Rabbit (1562)) was a tlatoani (king) of the Nahua city Tlatelolco.

== Name ==
His name is a Spanish version of Yaʻăqōbh (Jacob). Mendoza means cold mountain.

== Life ==
He was a colonial ruler, son of Zayoltzin. He died on 20 December, 5 Rabbit (1562).

His successor was the last ruler of Tlatelolco - Miguel García Oquiztzin.
