= Itzquauhtzin =

Tlatoani (king) of Aztec Tlatelolco

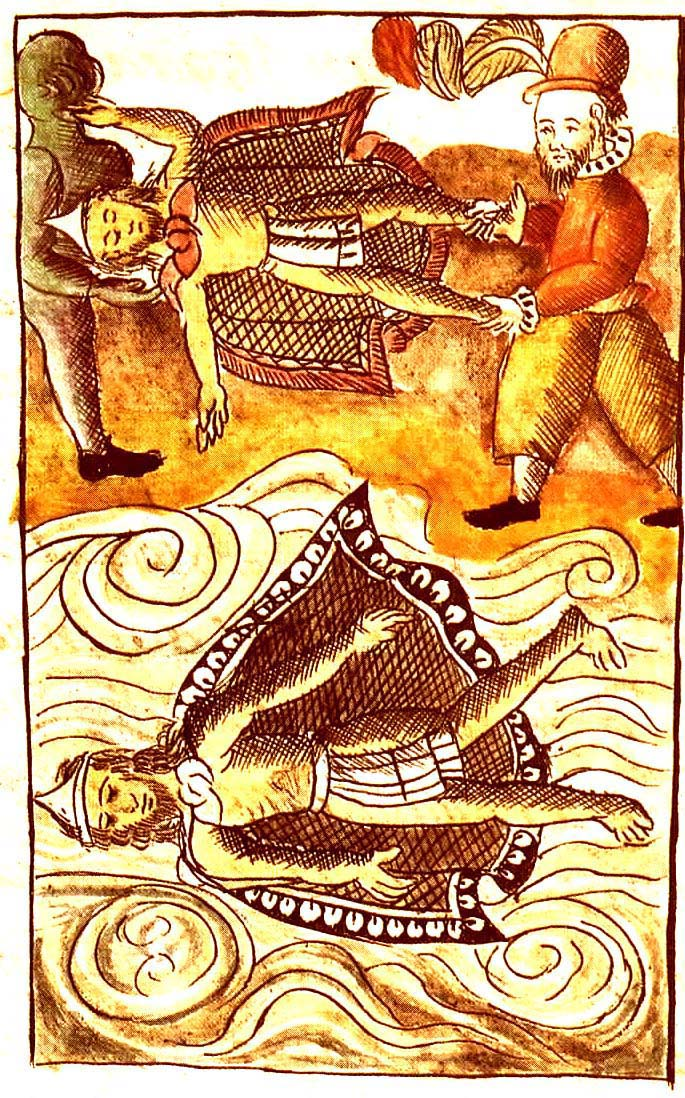
Spaniards disposing of the bodies of Moctezuma II and Itzquauhtzin

Itzquauhtzin (9 Reed (1475) – 2 Flint (1520)) was a king (tlatoani) of Nahua altepetl Tlatelolco. He was mentioned in Chimalpahin Codex.

== Biography ==
Itzquauhtzin was a son of the king Tlacateotl and his aunt Xiuhcanahualtzin and grandson of Quaquapitzahuac and queen Acxocueitl. His brother was king Tezozomoctli.

He was a quauhtlatoani (interim ruler). He was installed by Emperor Axayacatl of Tenochtitlan and killed by the Spaniards.

His successor was Diego de Mendoza.
