= Copil (son of Malinalxochitl) =

Aztec demigod

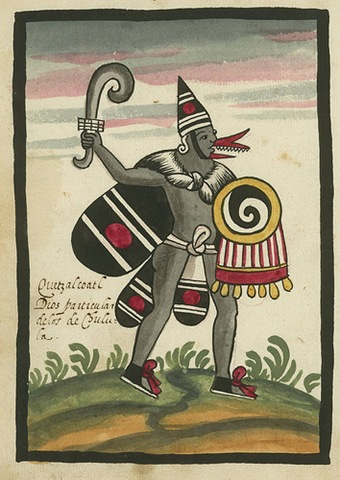

In Aztec mythology, Copil was the son of the goddess Malinalxochitl and Malinalco king, Chimalcuauhtli.

When grown he sought revenge for his mother's abandonment by her brother, Huītzilōpōchtli. When the Mexica were encamped at Chapultepec, he confronted his uncle. Hostility brewed, and Copil was killed on the hill Peñón de los Baños by Mexicas under orders of Huītzilōpōchtli, while Copil was awaiting to watch the battle between the Mexicas and tribes he incited to fight them. He was slain by priest Cuauhtlequetzqui, who later married Copil's daughter, Xicomoyahual. He was decapitated and his head was placed atop the hill and then an outcrop in Lake Texcoco. His heart was extracted and thrown into the swamp where it grew into nopal. It was here the Mexicas were given the signal to build Tenochtitlan.

== Bibliography ==
- Aveni, A. F.; Calnek, E. E.; Hartung, H. (1988). "Myth, Environment, and the Orientation of the Templo Mayor of Tenochtitlan". American Antiquity. 53 (2): 287–309. doi:10.2307/281020. ISSN 0002-7316.
- Bahr, Donald M. (2004). "Temptation and Glory in One Pima and Two Aztec Mythologies". Journal of the Southwest. 46 (4): 705–761. ISSN 0894-8410.
- Diel, Lori Boornazian (2005). "Women and Political Power: The Inclusion and Exclusion of Noblewomen in Aztec Pictorial Histories". RES: Anthropology and Aesthetics (47): 96. ISSN 0277-1322.
- Roskamp, Hans (2010). "LOS NAHUAS DE TZINTZUNTZAN-HUITZITZILAN, MICHOACÁN. HISTORIA, MITO Y LEGITIMACIÓN DE UN SEÑORÍO PREHISPÁNICO". Journal de la Société des américanistes. 96 (1): 75–106. ISSN 0037-9174.
