= Doris Heyden =

Doris Heyden (née Heydenreich; June 2, 1905 – September 25, 2005) was a prominent scholar of pre-Columbian Mesoamerican cultures, particularly those of central Mexico. She was born in East Orange, New Jersey, United States. She died on September 25, 2005, from the lingering aftereffects of a stroke suffered in 1999.

Heyden was a member of a group of artists, writers, folklorists, scholars, and political activists who together created the "Mexican Renaissance". The exponents of this post-Revolutionary circle drew upon Mexican history and traditions while contributing to a variety of international movements including realism, Symbolism, surrealism and communism. Important members were mural painters Diego Rivera, Frida Kahlo, José Clemente Orozco and David Alfaro Siqueiros, Zapotec painter Rufino Tamayo, mystical painters Remedios Varo and Leonora Carrington, caricaturist and Mesoamerican scholar Miguel Covarrubias, as well as photographer Manuel Álvarez Bravo.

== Early life ==
Born Doris Heydenreich Selz in 1905, Heyden claimed noble German and Austrian descent from a family with titles going back to 1312. She spent a happy and prosperous childhood in Maplewood, New Jersey, and Glencoe, Illinois, with access to New York City and Chicago. Her early life was illuminated by art, music, and books. She began writing and publishing at about age ten, at first concentrating on poetry and mysteries, and then contributing to Newark, New Jersey, newspapers around age thirteen. Heyden started painting even earlier, when she was five years old. Although she never became a great artist, she made her mark in another field.

== Education ==
Heyden studied art history and design at New York City's Pratt Institute, winning Senior Honors in 1936. After graduation she did illustrations for Mademoiselle magazine. It was in New York City that she became fascinated with the drawings of José Clemente Orozco and Mexican art in general. During the mid-1940s she traveled to Mexico. A friend gave her the name of a Mexican photographer. That man was Manuel Álvarez Bravo, arguably Mexico's greatest modernist photographer. Heyden and Álvarez Bravo married and had a son and daughter together. Mexico was Heyden's home for the rest of her life.

Heyden began formal graduate studies at the Escuela de Antropología, part of UNAM, Mexico's national university in 1956. She obtained her M.A. in 1969 and eventually acquired a doctorate there.

== Career ==
Employed by INAH, Mexico's National Institute of Anthropology and History, as curator of the Teotihuacan hall at the National Museum of Anthropology, she produced well over a hundred articles, books, and translations, both scholarly and popular, on a variety of topics, but most importantly on ancient architecture, Aztec symbolism, pre-Columbian views of what we would call nature, the importance of caves to Mesoamerican cosmology, and Indian cultural survivals.

== Major works ==
Heyden was a contributing editor of the influential Handbook of Latin American Studies (1961–68). All her writings were solidly based on archaeological fieldwork in many regions of Mexico. She also studied folk art and ethnology. Research in the world's great libraries and archives was another important aspect of her scholarship.

Until her death Doris Heyden maintained a welcoming house in Mexico City, which hosted numerous gatherings of anthropologists and other internationally renowned luminaries in her fields of study.

The influence of Doris Heyden in the field of pre-Columbian studies is evident from the two co-ordinated volumes of essays that have been dedicated to her. The first, in Spanish, is Chalchihuite edited by María de Jesús Rodríguez-Shadow and Beatriz Barba Ahuatzin de Piña Chan (1999). The second, in English, is the similarly titled In Chalchihuitl in quetzalli/Precious Greenstone Precious Quetzal Feather edited by Eloise Quiñones Keber (2000). The latter volume contains an interview with her.

== Publications ==
Her published works and contributions include:

- Pre-Columbian Architecture of Mesoamerica (1975, written with Paul Gendrop and published in Spanish the previous year)
- El Ciclo de vida del pilli y del macehual (1975, The Life Cycle of Noble and Commoner)
- Economía y religion de Teotihuacan (1977)
- La comunicación no verbal en el ritual (1979)
- The Great Temple and the Aztec Gods (1984, with Luis Francisco Villaseñor)
- Cuentos del Maíz (1985)
- Mitología y simbolismo de la flora en el México prehispánico (1983), Flora y Fauna en el México Prehispánico (1988; with Ana María Velasco)
- The Eagle, the Cactus, the Rock: The Roots of Mexico Tenochtitlan's Foundation Myth and Symbol (1989; published in Spanish the year before)
- Historia de las Indias de Nueva-España y islas de Tierra Firme (1994), a translation of Father Diego Durán's important sixteenth-century account of the religion and customs of pre-Columbian central Mexico.
