= Huītzilōpōchtli =

Aztec war and solar deity

- Patron God of the Mexica, God of Sun and War, Ruler of the South
- Member of the Tezcatlipocas
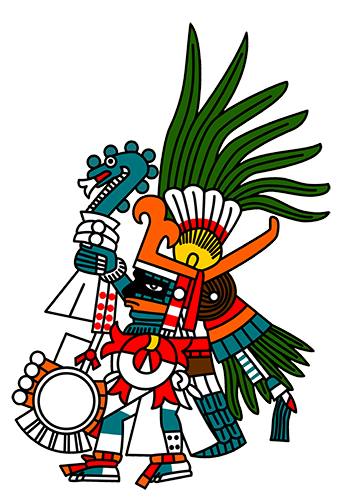
- Huitzilopochtli as depicted in the Codex Borbonicus
- Other names: Blue Tezcatlipoca, Omiteotl, Mextli, Mexi, Huitzitlon, Huitzilton, Tzintzuni, Huitzi
- Abode: Ilhuicatl-Teteocan (Twelfth Heaven); Ilhuicatl-Xoxoauhco (Seventh Heaven); the South
- Symbol: Hummingbird
- Gender: Male
- Region: Mesoamerica
- Ethnic group: Aztec (Mexica)
- Festivals: Panquetzaliztli

Genealogy
- Parents: Ometecuhtli and Omecihuatl (Codex Zumarraga); Mixcoatl and Coatlicue (Codex Florentine)
- Siblings: Quetzalcoatl, Xipe-Totec, Tezcatlipoca (Codex Zumarraga); Coyolxauhqui, Centzon Huitznahuac (Codex Florentine); Centzon Mimixcoa (Codex Ramirez); Malinalxochitl (Codex Azcatitlan)
- Children: None

Huitzilopochtli (Classical Nahuatl: Huītzilōpōchtli, IPA: [wiːt͡siloːˈpoːt͡ʃt͡ɬi]) is the solar and war deity of sacrifice in Aztec religion. He was also the patron god of the Aztecs and their capital city, Tenochtitlan. He wielded Xiuhcoatl, the fire serpent, as a weapon, thus also associating Huitzilopochtli with fire.

The Spaniards recorded the deity's name as Huichilobos. During their discovery and conquest of the Aztec Empire, they wrote that human sacrifice was common in worship ceremonies. These took place frequently throughout the region. When performed, typically multiple victims were sacrificed per day at any one of the numerous temples.

== Etymology ==
There continues to be disagreement about the full significance of Huītzilōpōchtli's name. Generally it is agreed that there are two elements, huītzilin "hummingbird" and ōpōchtli "left hand side". The name is often translated as "Left-Handed Hummingbird" or "Hummingbird of the South" on the basis that Aztec cosmology associated the south with the left hand side of the body.

However, Frances Karttunen points out that in Classical Nahuatl compounds are usually head final, implying that a more accurate translation may be "the left (or south) side of the hummingbird".

The hummingbird was spiritually important in Aztec culture. Diego Durán describes what appears to be the hummingbird hibernating in a tree, somewhat like the common poorwill does. He writes: "It appears to be dead, but at the advent of spring, ... the little bird is reborn."

== Origin stories ==
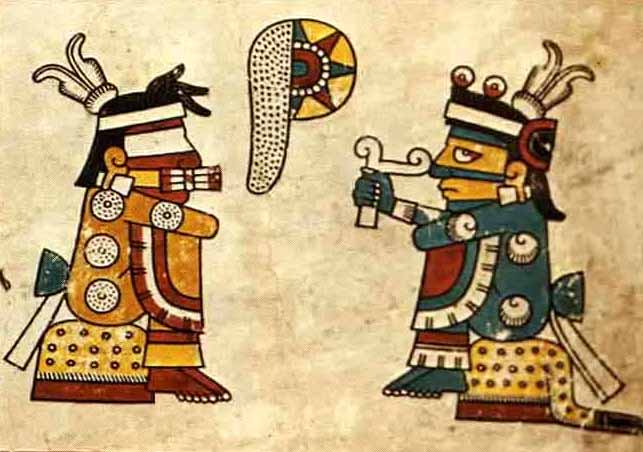
Blue and Red Tezcatlipocas in the Codex Fejérváry-Mayer

There are a handful of origin mythologies describing the deity's beginnings. One story tells of the cosmic creation and Huitzilopochtli's role in it. According to this legend, he was the smallest son of four—his parents being the creator couple of the Ōmeteōtl (Tōnacātēcuhtli and Tōnacācihuātl) while his brothers were Quetzalcōātl ("Precious Serpent" or "Quetzal-Feathered Serpent"), Xīpe Tōtec ("Our Lord Flayed"), and Tezcatlipōca ("Smoking Mirror"). His mother and father instructed him and Quetzalcoatl to bring order to the world. Together, Huitzilopochtli and Quetzalcoatl created fire, the first male and female humans, the Earth, and the Sun.

Another origin story tells of a fierce goddess, Coatlicue, being impregnated as she was sweeping by a ball of feathers on Mount Coatepec ("Serpent Hill"; near Tula, Hidalgo). Her other children, who were already fully grown, were the four hundred male Centzonuitznaua and the female deity Coyolxauhqui. These children, angered by the manner by which their mother became impregnated, conspired to kill her. Huitzilopochtli burst forth from his mother's womb in full armor and fully grown, or in other versions of the story, burst forth from the womb and immediately put on his gear. He attacked his older brothers and sister, defending his mother by beheading his sister and casting her body from the mountain top. He also chased after his brothers, who fled from him and became scattered all over the sky. This same story exists also with Quetzalcoatl instead.

Huitzilopochtli is seen as the sun in mythology, while his many male siblings are perceived as the stars and his sister as the moon. In the Aztec worldview, this is the reason why the Sun is constantly chasing the Moon and stars. It is also why it was so important to provide tribute for Huitzilopochtli as sustenance for the Sun. If Huitzilopochtli did not have enough strength to battle his siblings, they would destroy their mother and thus the world.

== History ==
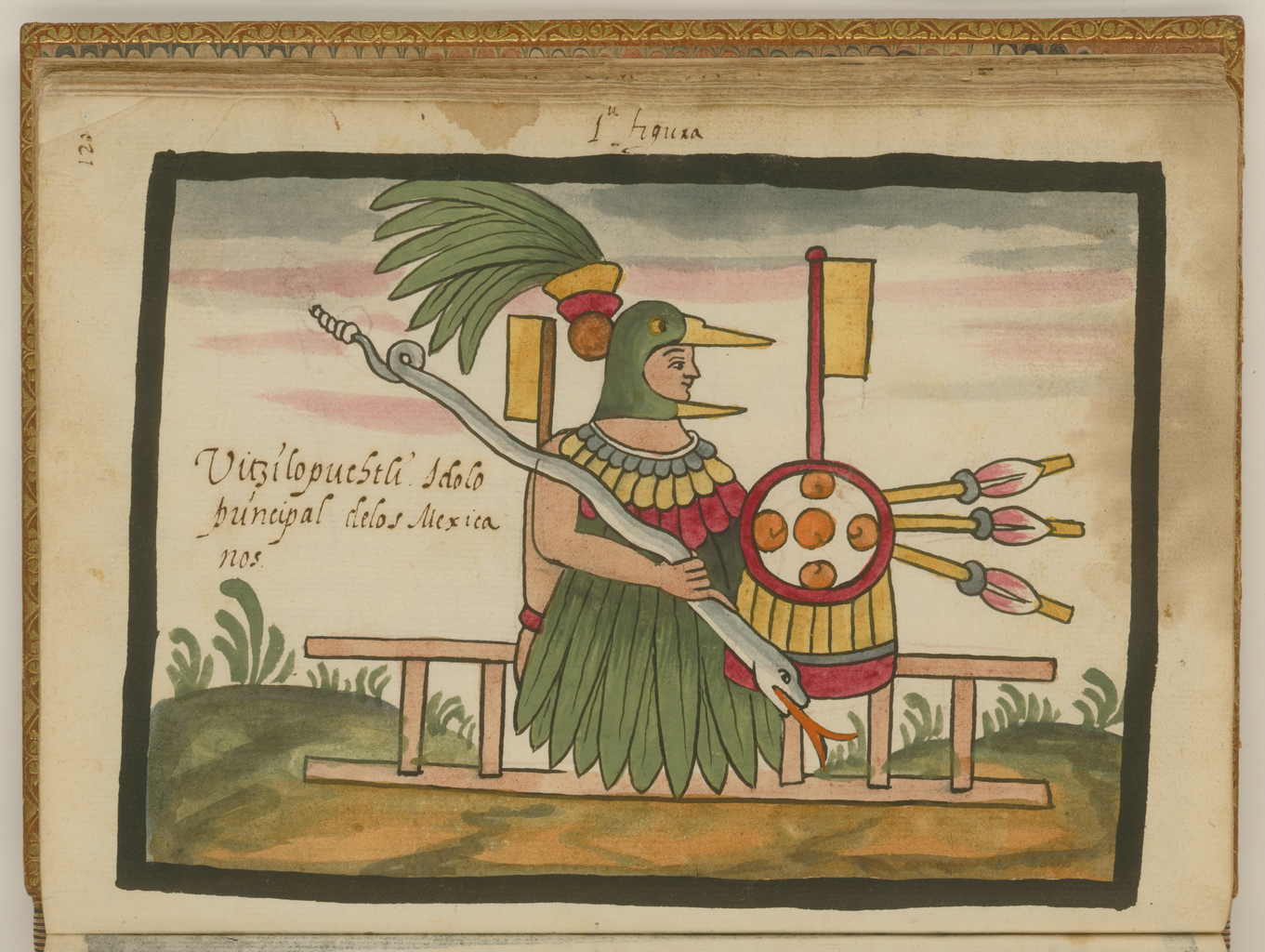
Huitzilopochtli, as depicted in the Codex Tovar

Huitzilopochtli was the patron god of the Mexica tribe. Originally, he was of little importance to the Nahuas, but after the rise of the Aztecs, Tlacaelel reformed their religion and put Huitzilopochtli at the same level as Quetzalcoatl, Tlaloc, and Tezcatlipoca, making him a solar god. Through this, Huitzilopochtli replaced Nanahuatzin, the solar god from the Nahua legend. Huitzilopochtli was said to be in a constant struggle with the darkness and required nourishment in the form of sacrifices to ensure the sun would survive the cycle of 52 years, which was the basis of many Mesoamerican myths.

There were 18 especially holy festive days, and only one of them was dedicated to Huitzilopochtli. This celebration day, known as Toxcatl, falls within the fifteenth month of the Mexican calendar. During the festival, captives and slaves were brought forth and slain ceremoniously.

In the book El Calendario Mexica y la Cronografia by Rafael Tena and published by the National Institute of Anthropology and History of Mexico, the author gives the last day of the Nahuatl month Panquetzaliztli as the date of the celebration of the rebirth of the Lord Huitzilopochtli on top of Coatepec (Snake Hill); December 9 in the Julian calendar or December 19 in the Gregorian calendar with the variant of December 18 in leap years.

=== Sacrifice ===
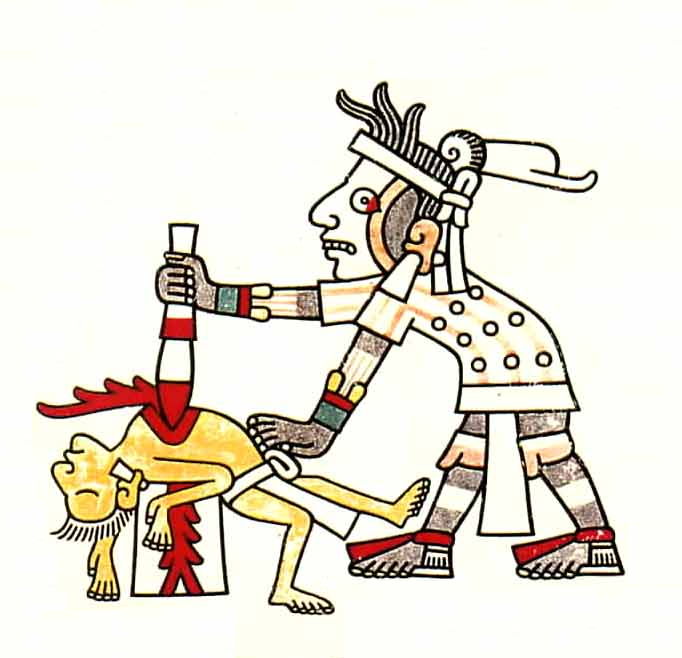
Human sacrifice depicted in the Codex Laud

Ritual sacrifice and self bloodletting were key offerings to Huitzilopochtli. The Aztecs performed ritual self-sacrifice (also called autosacrifice or blood-letting) on a daily basis. The Aztecs believed that Huitzilopochtli needed daily nourishment (tlaxcaltiliztli) in the form of human blood and hearts and that they, as "people of the sun", were required to provide Huitzilopochtli with his sustenance.

When the Aztecs sacrificed people to Huitzilopochtli, the victim would be placed on a sacrificial stone. The priest would then cut through the abdomen with an obsidian or flint blade. The heart would be torn out still beating and held towards the sky in honor to the Sun-God. The body would then be pushed down the pyramid where the Coyolxauhqui stone could be found. The Coyolxauhqui Stone recreates the story of Coyolxauhqui, Huitzilopochtli's sister who was dismembered at the base of a mountain, just as the sacrificial victims were. The body would be carried away and either cremated or given to the warrior responsible for the capture of the victim. He would either cut the body in pieces and send them to important people as an offering, or use the pieces for ritual cannibalism. The warrior would thus ascend one step in the hierarchy of the Aztec social classes, a system that rewarded successful warriors.

During the festival of Panquetzaliztli, of which Huitzilopochtli was the patron, sacrificial victims were adorned in the manner of Huitzilopochtli's costume and blue body paint, before their hearts would be sacrificially removed. Representations of Huitzilopochtli called teixiptla were also worshipped, the most significant being the one at the Templo Mayor which was made of dough mixed with sacrificial blood.

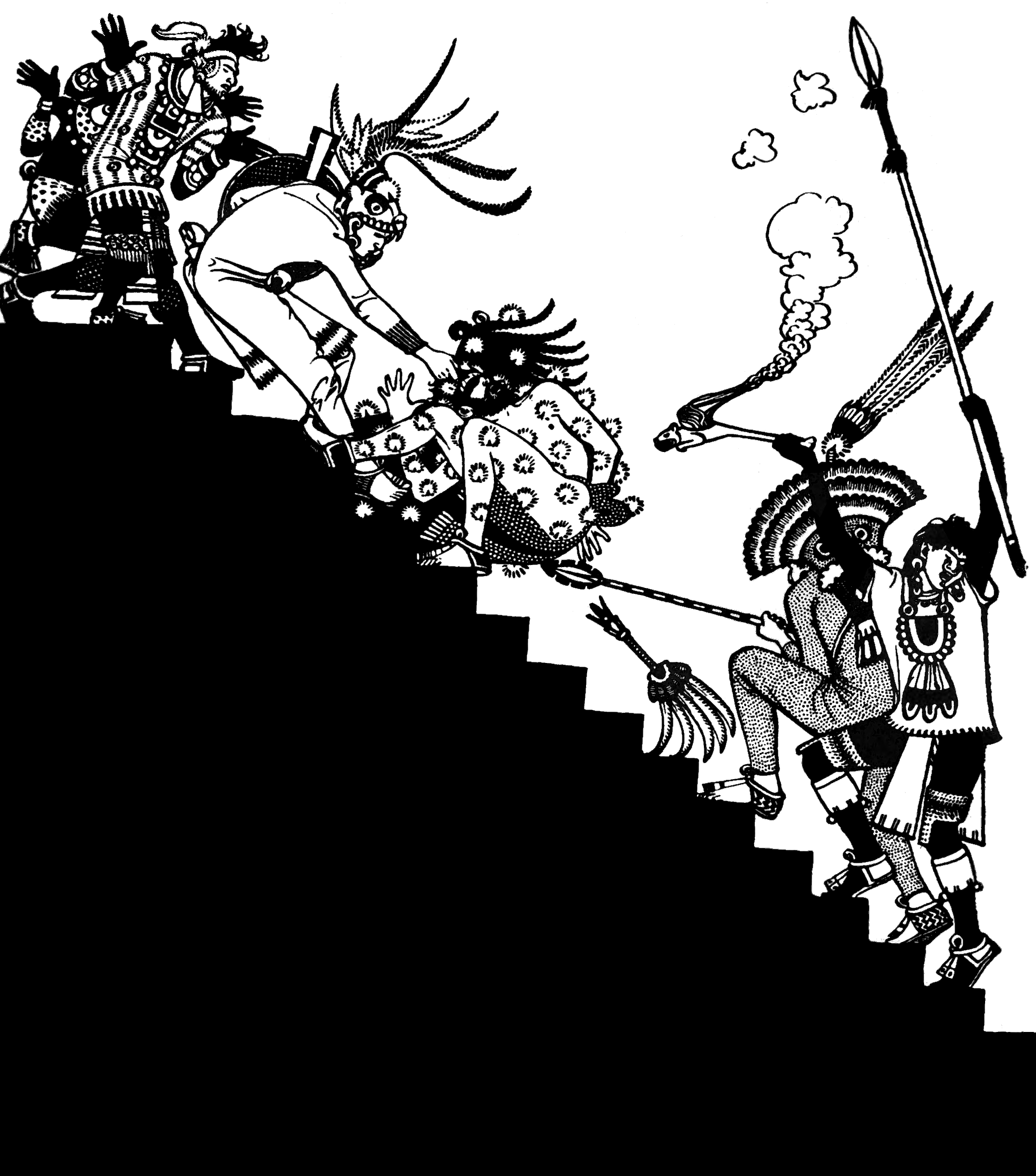
Prisoners for sacrifice were decorated.

Warriors who died in battle or as sacrifices to Huitzilopochtli were called quauhteca ("the eagle's people"). War was an important source of both human and material tribute. Human tribute was used for sacrificial purposes because human blood was believed to be extremely important, and thus powerful. According to Aztec mythology, Huitzilopochtli needed blood as sustenance in order to continue to keep his sister and many brothers at bay as he chased them through the sky.

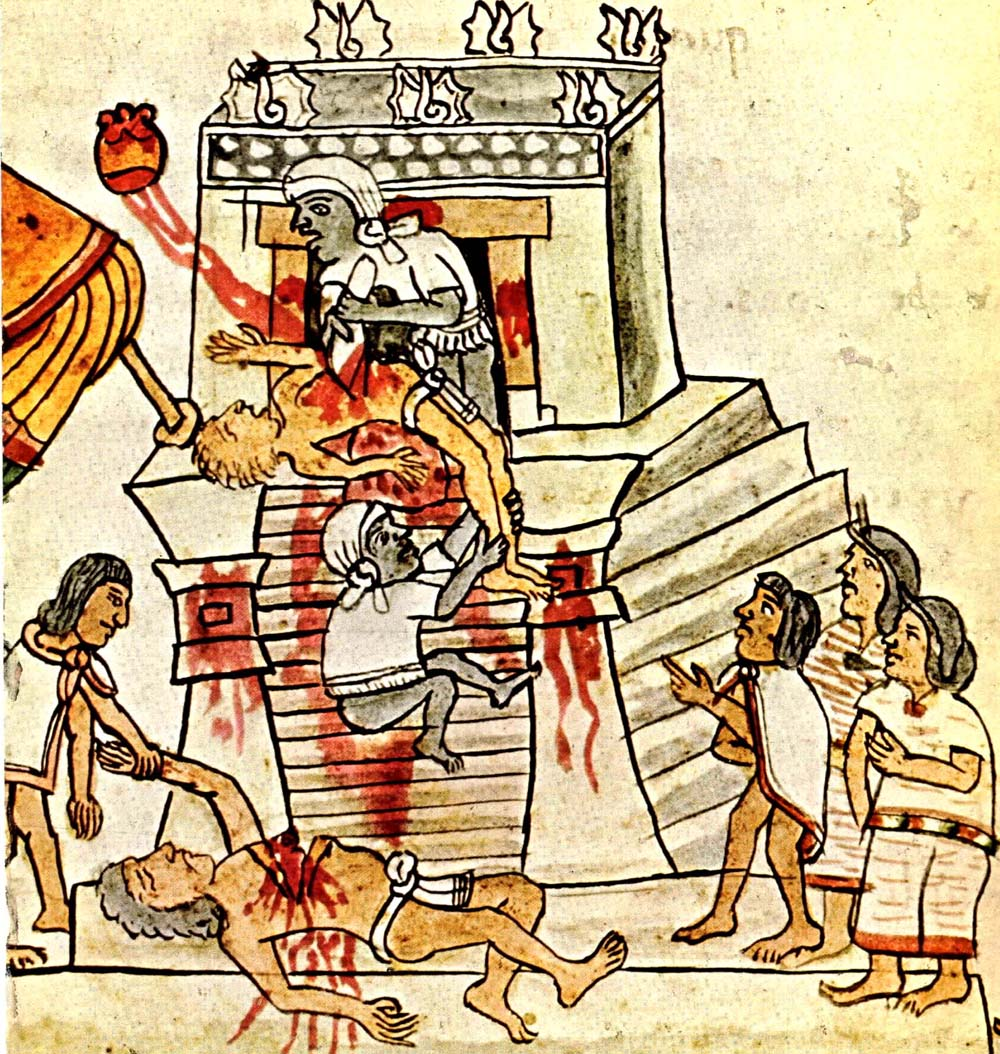
Human sacrifice as shown in the Codex Magliabechiano

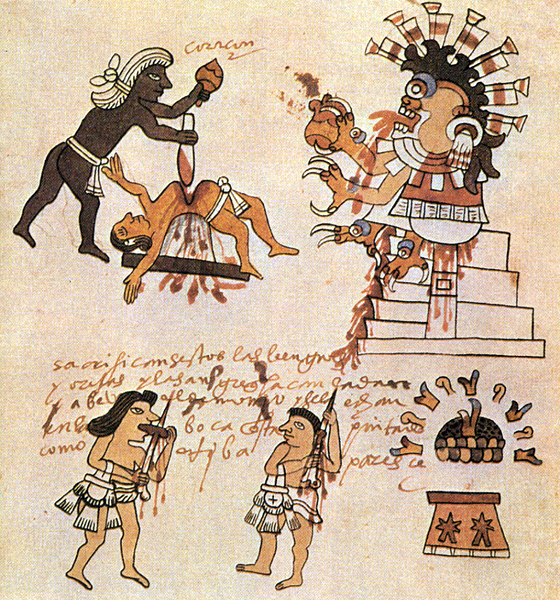
Codex Tudela

== The Templo Mayor ==
The most important and powerful structure in Tenochtitlan is the Templo Mayor. Its importance as the sacred center is reflected in the fact that it was enlarged frontally eleven times during the two hundred years of its existence. The Great Temple of Tenochtitlan was dedicated to Huitzilopochtli and Tlaloc, the rain god. 16th century Dominican friar Diego Durán wrote: "These two gods were always meant to be together, since they were considered companions of equal power." The Templo Mayor consisted of a pyramidal platform, on top of which were twin temples, one painted with blue stripes and the other painted red. The red shrine, on the south side, was dedicated to Huitzilopochtli, while the blue shrine to the north was dedicated to Tlaloc. That these two deities were on opposite sides of the Great Temple is very representative of the Aztec dichotomy that the deities represent. Tlaloc, as the rain god, represented fertility and growth, while Huitzilopochtli, as the sun god, represented war and sacrifice.

== The Coyolxauhqui stone ==
The Coyolxauhqui stone was found directly at the base of the stairway leading up to Huitzilopochtli's temple. On both sides of the stairway's base were two large grinning serpent heads. The image is clear. The Templo Mayor is the image of Coatepec or Serpent Mountain where the divine battle took place. Just as Huitzilopochtli triumphed at the top of the mountain, while his sister was dismembered and fell to pieces below, so Huitzilopochtli's temple and icon sat triumphantly at the top of the Templo Mayor while the carving of the dismembered goddess lay far below. This drama of sacrificial dismemberment was vividly repeated in some of the offerings found around the Coyolxauhqui stone in which the decapitated skulls of young women were placed. This would suggest that there was a ritual reenactment of the myth at the dedication of the stone sometime in the latter part of the fifteenth century.

== Mythology ==
Many gods in the pantheon of deities of the Aztecs were inclined to have a fondness for a particular aspect of warfare. However, Huitzilopochtli was known as the primary god of war in ancient Mexico. Since he was the patron god of the Mexica, he was credited with both the victories and defeats that the Mexica people had on the battlefield. The people had to make sacrifices to him to protect the Aztec from infinite night.

According to Miguel León-Portilla, in this new vision from Tlacaelel, the warriors that died in battle and women who died in childbirth would go to serve Huitzilopochtli in his palace (in the south, or left). From a description in the Florentine Codex, Huitzilopochtli was so bright that the warrior souls had to use their shields to protect their eyes. They could only see the god through the arrow holes in their shields, so it was the bravest warrior who could see him best. Warriors and women who died during childbirth were transformed into hummingbirds upon death and went to join Huitzilopochtli.

As the precise studies of Johanna Broda have shown, the creation myth consisted of "several layers of symbolism, ranging from a purely historical explanation to one in terms of cosmovision and possible astronomical content". At one level, Huitzilopochtli's birth and victorious battle against the four hundred children represent the character of the solar region of the Aztecs in that the daily sunrise was viewed as a celestial battle against the moon (Coyolxauhqui) and the stars (Centzon Huitznahua). Another version of the myth, found in the historical chronicles of Diego Duran and Alvarado Tezozomoc, tells the story with strong historical allusion and portrays two Aztec factions in ferocious battle. The leader of one group, Huitzilopochtli, defeats the warriors of a woman leader, Coyolxauh, and tears open their breasts and eats their hearts. Both versions tell of the origin of human sacrifice at the sacred place, Coatepec, during the rise of the Aztec nation and at the foundation of Tenochtitlan.

=== Origins of Tenochtitlan ===
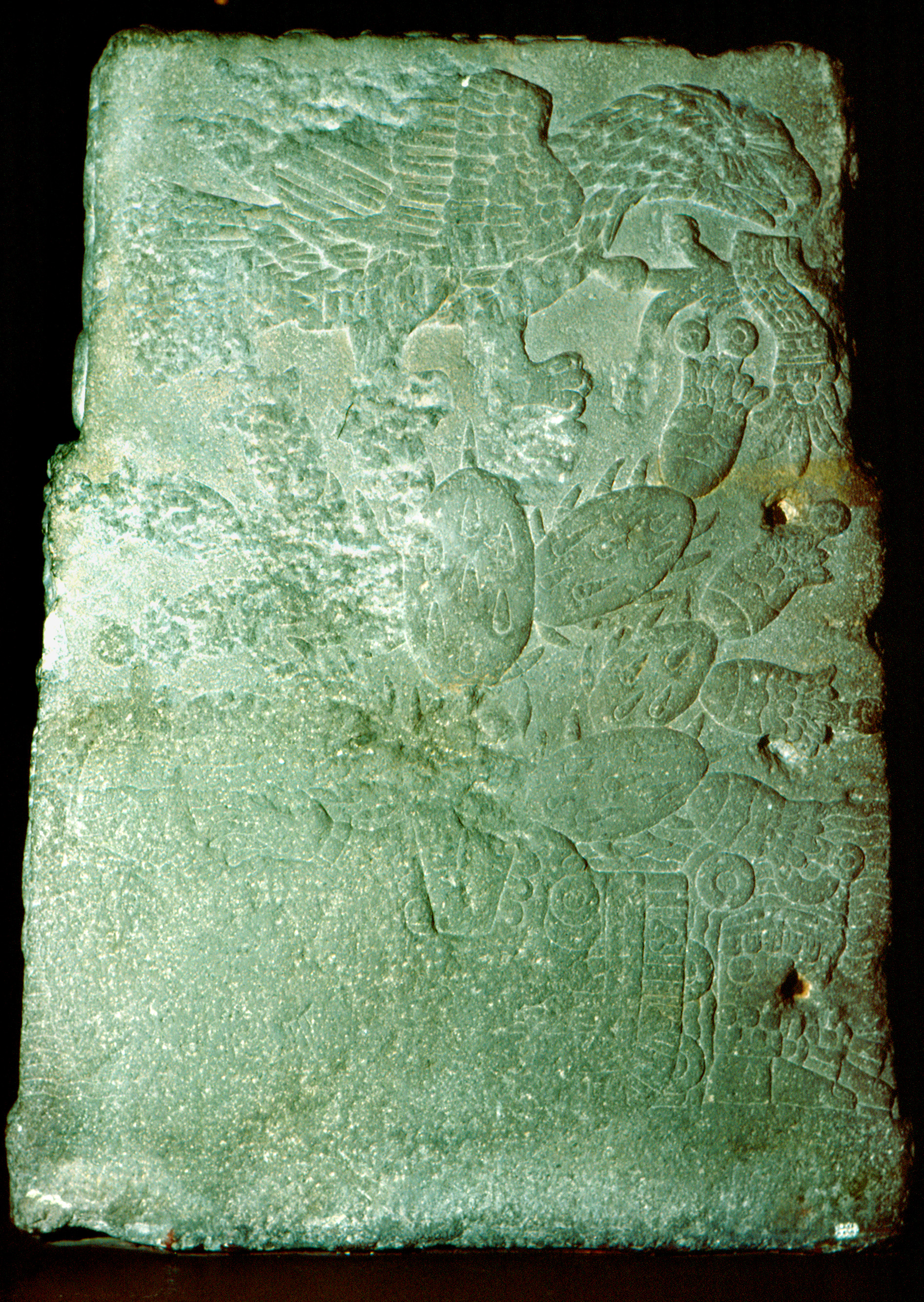
The founding of the Aztec capital Tenochtitlan; An eagle representing Huitzilopochtli, which exhales the atl-tlachinolli (war symbol), is perched on a nopal cactus. Teocalli of the Sacred War, sculpted in 1325.

There are several legends and myths of Huitzilopochtli. According to the Aubin Codex, the Aztecs originally came from a place called Aztlán. They lived under the ruling of a powerful elite called the "Azteca Chicomoztoca". Huitzilopochtli ordered them to abandon Aztlán and find a new home. He also ordered them never to call themselves Aztec; instead they should be called "Mexica". Huitzilopochtli guided them through the journey. For a time, Huitzilopochtli left them in the charge of his sister, Malinalxochitl, who, according to legend, founded Malinalco, but the Aztecs resented her ruling and called back Huitzilopochtli. He put his sister to sleep and ordered the Aztecs to leave the place. When she woke up and realized she was alone, she became angry and desired revenge. She gave birth to a son called Copil. When he grew up, he confronted Huitzilopochtli, who had to kill him. Huitzilopochtli then took his heart out and threw it in the middle of Lake Texcoco. Many years later, Huitzilopochtli ordered the Aztecs to search for Copil's heart and build their city over it. The sign would be an eagle perched on a cactus, eating a precious serpent, and the place would become their permanent home. After much traveling, they arrived at the area which would eventually be Tenochtitlan on an island in the Lago Texcoco of the Valley of Mexico.

== Iconography ==
Huitzilopochtli in the Codex Borbonicus

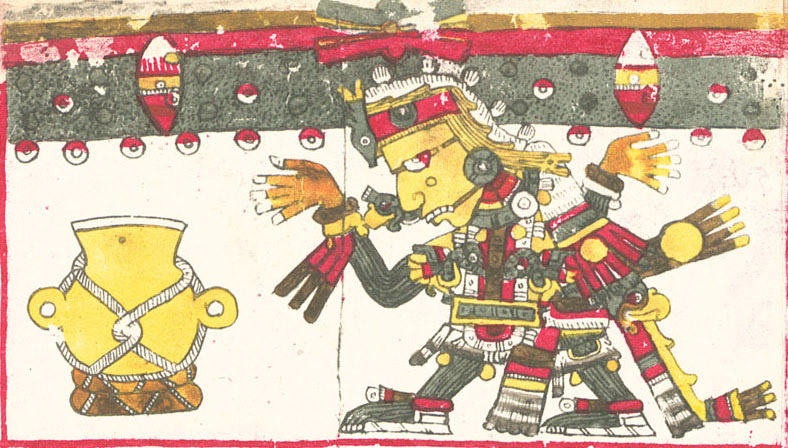
Xiuhtecuhtli in the Codex Borgia

In art and iconography, Huitzilopochtli could be represented either as a hummingbird or as an anthropomorphic figure with just the feathers of such on his head and left leg, a black face, and holding a scepter shaped like a snake and a mirror. According to the Florentine Codex, Huitzilopochtli's body was painted blue. In the great temple his statue was decorated with cloth, feathers, gold, and jewels, and was hidden behind a curtain to give it more reverence and veneration. Another variation lists him having a face that was marked with yellow and blue stripes and he carries around the fire serpent Xiuhcoatl with him. According to legend, the statue was supposed to be destroyed by the soldier Gil González de Benavides, but it was rescued by a man called Tlatolatl. The statue appeared some years later during an investigation by Bishop Zummáraga in the 1530s, only to be lost again. There is speculation that the statue still exists in a cave somewhere in the Anahuac Valley.

He always had a blue-green hummingbird helmet in any of the depictions found. In fact, his hummingbird helmet was the one item that consistently defined him as Huitzilopochtli, the sun god, in artistic renderings. He is usually depicted as holding a shield adorned with balls of eagle feathers, a homage to his mother and the story of his birth. He also holds the blue snake, Xiuhcoatl, in his hand in the form of an atlatl.

== Calendar ==
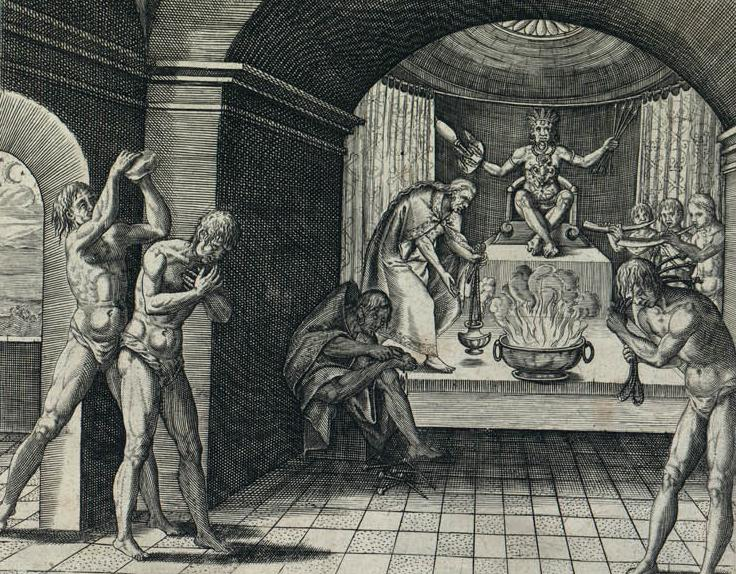
An imaginative European depiction of an Aztec shrine. The idol of Huitzilopochtli is seated in the background. (1602)

Diego Durán described the festivities for Huitzilopochtli. Panquetzaliztli (November 9 to November 28) was the Aztec month dedicated to Huitzilopochtli. People decorated their homes and trees with paper flags; there were ritual races, processions, dances, songs, prayers, and finally human sacrifices. This was one of the more important Aztec festivals, and the people prepared for the whole month. They fasted or ate very little; a statue of the god was made with amaranth (huautli) seeds and honey, and at the end of the month, it was cut into small pieces so everybody could eat a little piece of the god. After the Spanish conquest, cultivation of amaranth was outlawed, while some of the festivities were subsumed into the Christmas celebration.

According to the Ramírez Codex, in Tenochtitlan approximately sixty prisoners were sacrificed at the festivities. Sacrifices were reported to be made in other Aztec cities, including Tlatelolco, Xochimilco, and Texcoco, but the number is unknown, and no currently available archeological findings confirm this.

For the reconsecration of Great Pyramid of Tenochtitlan in 1487, dedicated to Tlaloc and Huitzilopochtli, the Aztecs reported that they sacrificed about 20,400 prisoners over the course of four days. While accepted by some scholars, this claim also has been considered Aztec propaganda. There were 19 altars in the city of Tenochtitlan.

== See also ==
- History of Mexico City
- Human sacrifice in Aztec culture
- List of solar deities

== General and cited references ==
- Andrews, J. Richard (2003). Introduction to Classical Nahuatl (revised ed.). Norman: University of Oklahoma Press. ISBN 978-0-8061-3452-9. OCLC 50090230.
- Boone, Elizabeth Hill (1989). Incarnations of the Aztec Supernatural: The Image of Huitzilopochtli in Mexico and Europe. Transactions of the American Philosophical Society, vol. 79 part 2. Philadelphia: American Philosophical Society. ISBN 978-0-87169-792-9. OCLC 20141678.
- Brinton, Daniel G., ed. (1890). Rig Veda Americanus. Sacred Songs of the Ancient Mexicans, with a Gloss in Nahuatl (Project Gutenberg EBook #14993, online reproduction). Brinton's Library of Aboriginal American Literature, No. VIII (in English and Nahuatl). Philadelphia: D.G. Brinton. OCLC 6979651.
- de San Anton Munon Chimalpahin, Don Domingo (1997). Codex Chimalpahin, Volume 2: Society and Politics in Mexico Tenochtitlan, Tlatelolco, Texcoco, Culhuacan, and Other Nahua Altepetl in Central Mexico. Oklahoma: University of Oklahoma Press. ISBN 978-0-8061-2950-1.
- Broda, Johanna (2001). Cosmovision, Ritual E Identidad de Los Pueblos Indigenas de Mexico. Fondo de Cultura Economica USA. ISBN 978-968-16-6178-6.
- Carrasco, David (1982). Quetzalcoatl and the Irony of Empire: Myths and Prophecies in the Aztec Tradition. Chicago: University of Chicago Press. ISBN 978-0-226-09487-8. OCLC 0226094871.
- Coe, Michael D.; Rex Koontz (2008). Mexico: From the Olmecs to the Aztecs. London: Thames & Hudson. ISBN 978-0-500-28755-2. OCLC 2008901003.
- Díaz del Castillo, Bernal (1963) [1632]. The Conquest of New Spain. Penguin Classics. Translated by J. M. Cohen (6th printing (1973) ed.). Harmondsworth, England: Penguin Books. ISBN 978-0-14-044123-9. OCLC 162351797.
- Diego Durán (1971). Book of Gods and Rites. Translated by Fernando Horcasitas and Doris Heyden. University of Oklahoma Press. LCCN 73-88147.
- Elzey, Wayne (1991). "A Hill on a Land Surrounded by Water: An Aztec Story of Origin and Destiny". History of Religions 31(2): 105–149
- Klein, Cecelia, F. (2008). "A New Interpretation of the Aztec Statue Called Coatlicue, 'Snakes-Her-Skirt'" Ethnohistory 55(2)
- Miller, Mary; Karl Taube (1993). The Gods and Symbols of Ancient Mexico and the Maya: An Illustrated Dictionary of Mesoamerican Religion. London: Thames & Hudson. ISBN 978-0-500-05068-2. OCLC 27667317.
- Quiñones Keber, Eloise (1995). Codex Telleriano-Remensis: Ritual, Divination, and History in a Pictorial Aztec Manuscript. Michel Besson (illus.). Austin: University of Texas Press. ISBN 978-0-292-76901-4. OCLC 29600936.
- Read, Kay Almere (1998). Time and Sacrifice in the Aztec Cosmos. Bloomington: Indiana University Press. ISBN 978-0-253-33400-8. OCLC 37909790.
- Read, Kay Almere; Jason J. González (2002). Handbook of Mesoamerican Mythology: A Guide to the Gods, Heroes, Rituals, and Beliefs of Mexico and Central America. Oxford and New York: Oxford University Press. ISBN 978-0-19-514909-8. OCLC 77857686.
- Sahagún, Bernardino de (1950–82) [ca. 1540–85]. Florentine Codex: General History of the Things of New Spain, 13 vols. in 12. vols. I-XII. Charles E. Dibble and Arthur J. O. Anderson (eds., trans., notes and illus.) (translation of Historia General de las Cosas de la Nueva España ed.). Santa Fe, NM and Salt Lake City: School of American Research and the University of Utah Press. ISBN 978-0-87480-082-1. OCLC 276351.
- Spence, Lewis (1913). The Myths of Mexico and Peru (online reproduction ed.). London: G. G. Harrap and Co. OCLC 710093.
- Taube, Karl A. (1993). Aztec and Maya Myths (4th University of Texas printing ed.). Austin: University of Texas Press. ISBN 978-0-292-78130-6. OCLC 29124568.
- Wimmer, Alexis (2006). "Dictionnaire de la langue nahuatl classique" (online version, incorporating reproductions from Dictionnaire de la langue nahuatl ou mexicaine [1885], by Rémi Siméon) (in French and Nahuatl).
