= Tlatelolco (altepetl) =

Pre-Columbian city-state in Mexico

Coordinates: 19.4511°N 99.1375°W

Mēxihco-Tlatelōlco
- 1337–1473
- The Aztec glyph for Tlatelolco
- Common languages: Classical Nahuatl
- Religion: Aztec religion
- Government: Monarchy
- Tlatoani
  - 1376–1417: Quaquapitzahuac
  - 1417–1428: Tlacateotl
  - 1428–1460: Quauhtlatoa
  - 1460–1473: Moquihuix
  - 1475–1520: Itzquauhtzin
- Historical era: Pre-Columbian
  - Established: 1337
  - War with Tenochtitlan: 1473

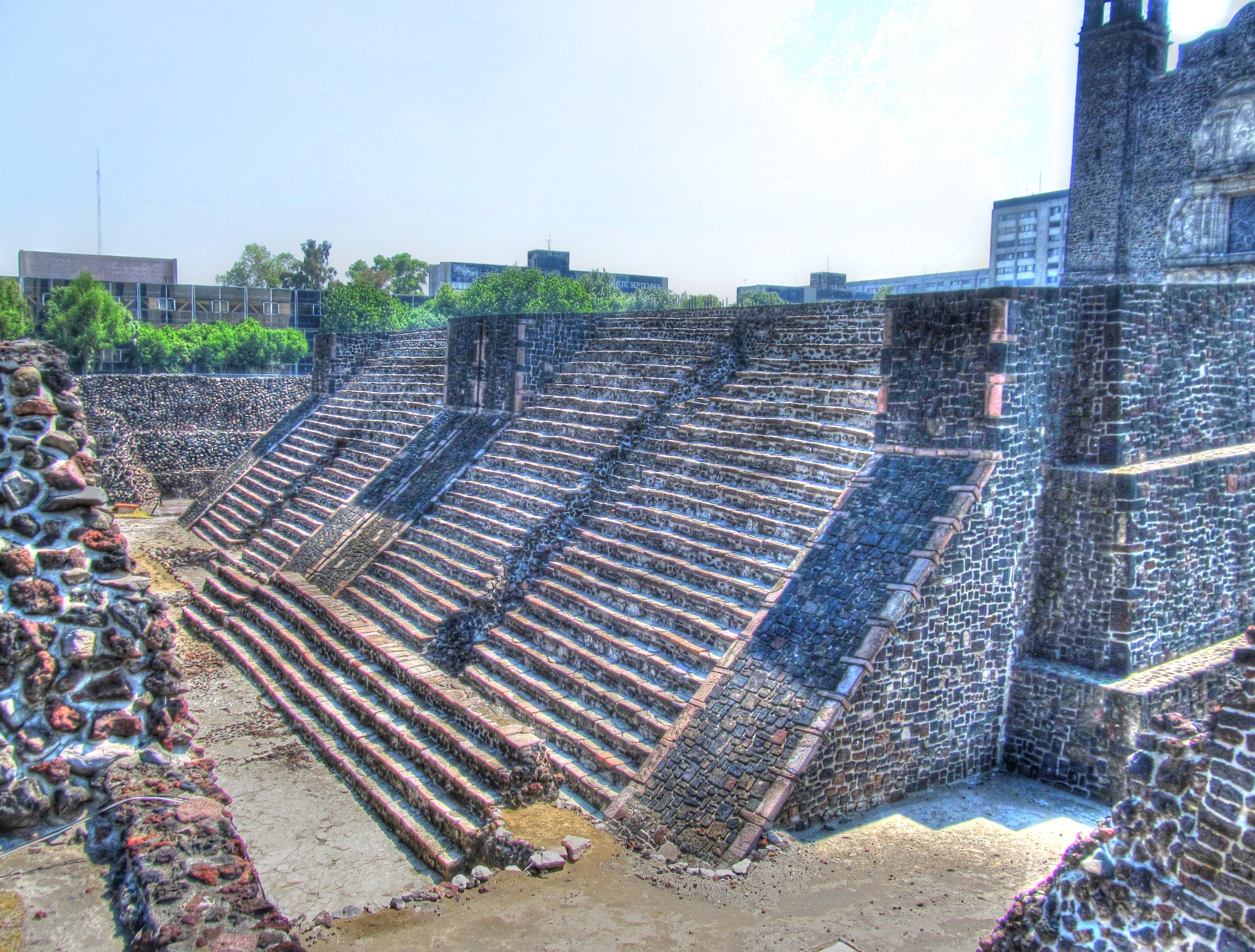
Great Pyramid of Tlatelolco, Plaza of Three Cultures

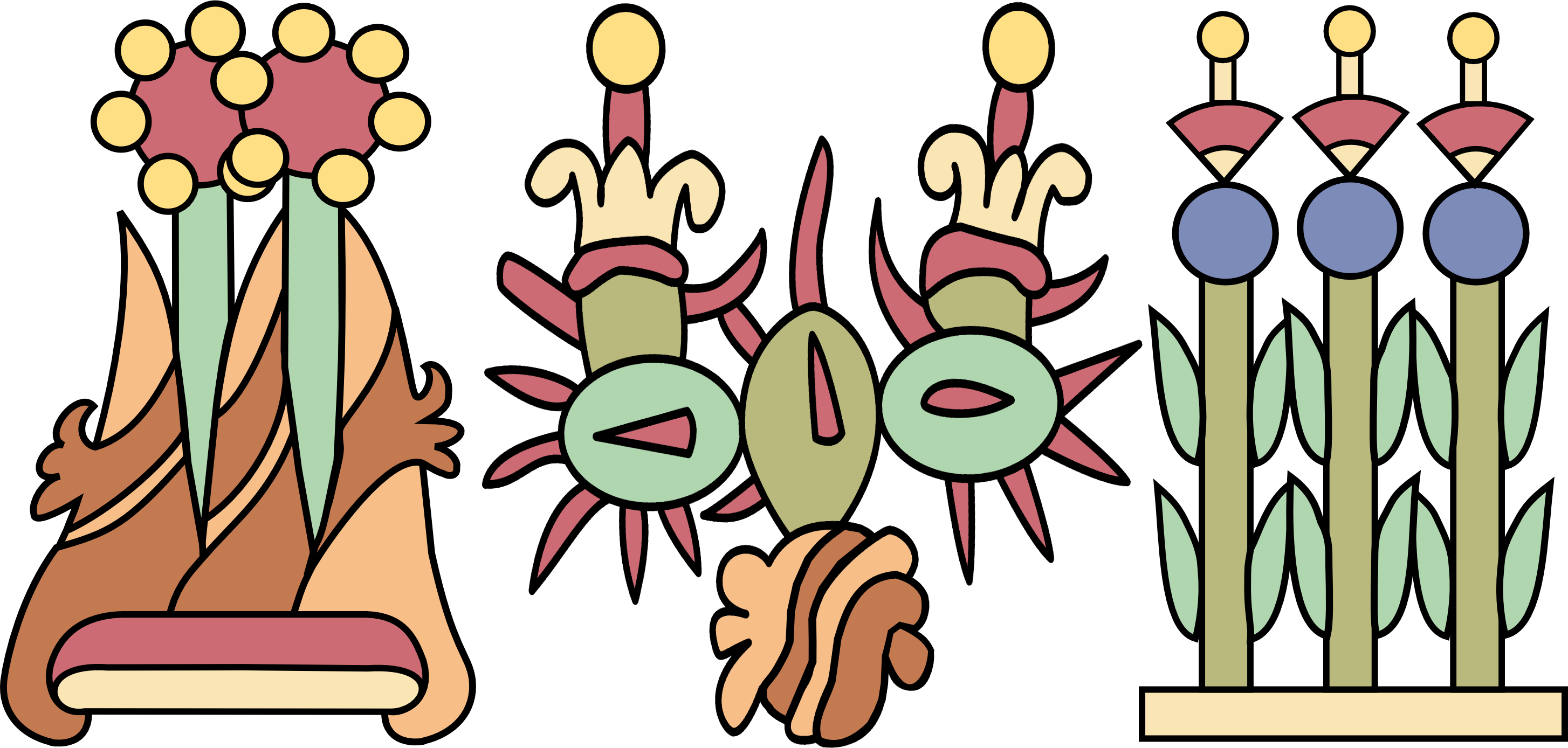
Aztec glyphs for the member-states of the Aztec Triple Alliance: Texcoco (left), Tenochtitlan (middle), and Tlacopan (right).

Tlatelolco (Classical Nahuatl: Mēxihco-Tlatelōlco [tɬateˈloːɬko], modern Nahuatl pronunciation) (also called Mexico Tlatelolco) was a pre-Columbian altepetl, or city-state, in the Valley of Mexico. Its inhabitants, known as the Tlatelolca, were part of the Mexica, a Nahuatl-speaking people who arrived in what is now central Mexico in the 13th century. The Mexica settled on an island in Lake Texcoco and founded the altepetl of Mexico-Tenochtitlan on the southern portion of the island. In 1337, a group of dissident Mexica broke away from the Tenochca leadership in Tenochtitlan and founded Mexico-Tlatelolco on the northern portion of the island. Tenochtitlan was closely tied with Tlatelolco, and was largely dependent on its market, the most important site of commerce in the area.

== History ==
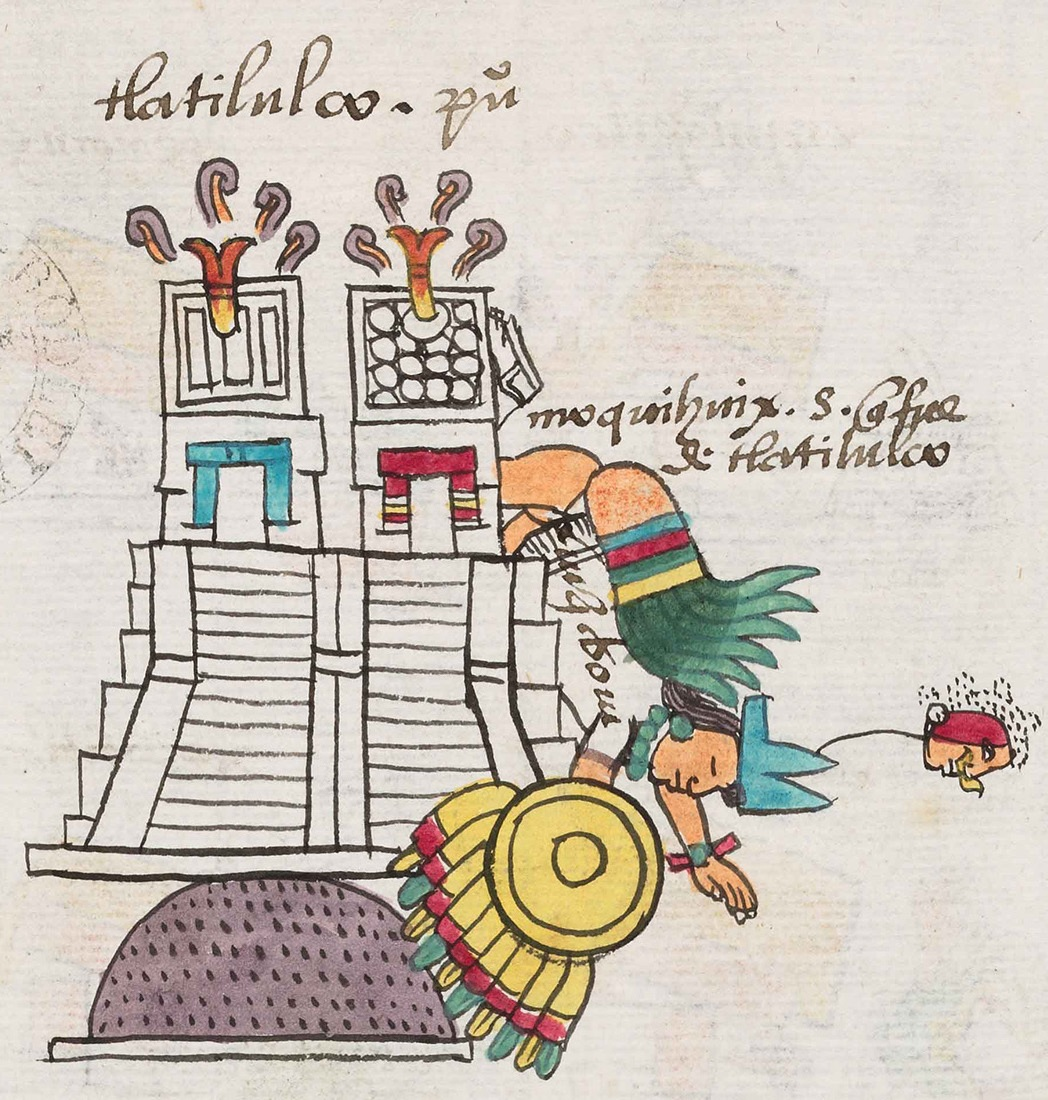
Defeat of the Tlatoani of Mexico-Tlatelolco, Moquihuix, in 1473, according to Codex Mendoza.

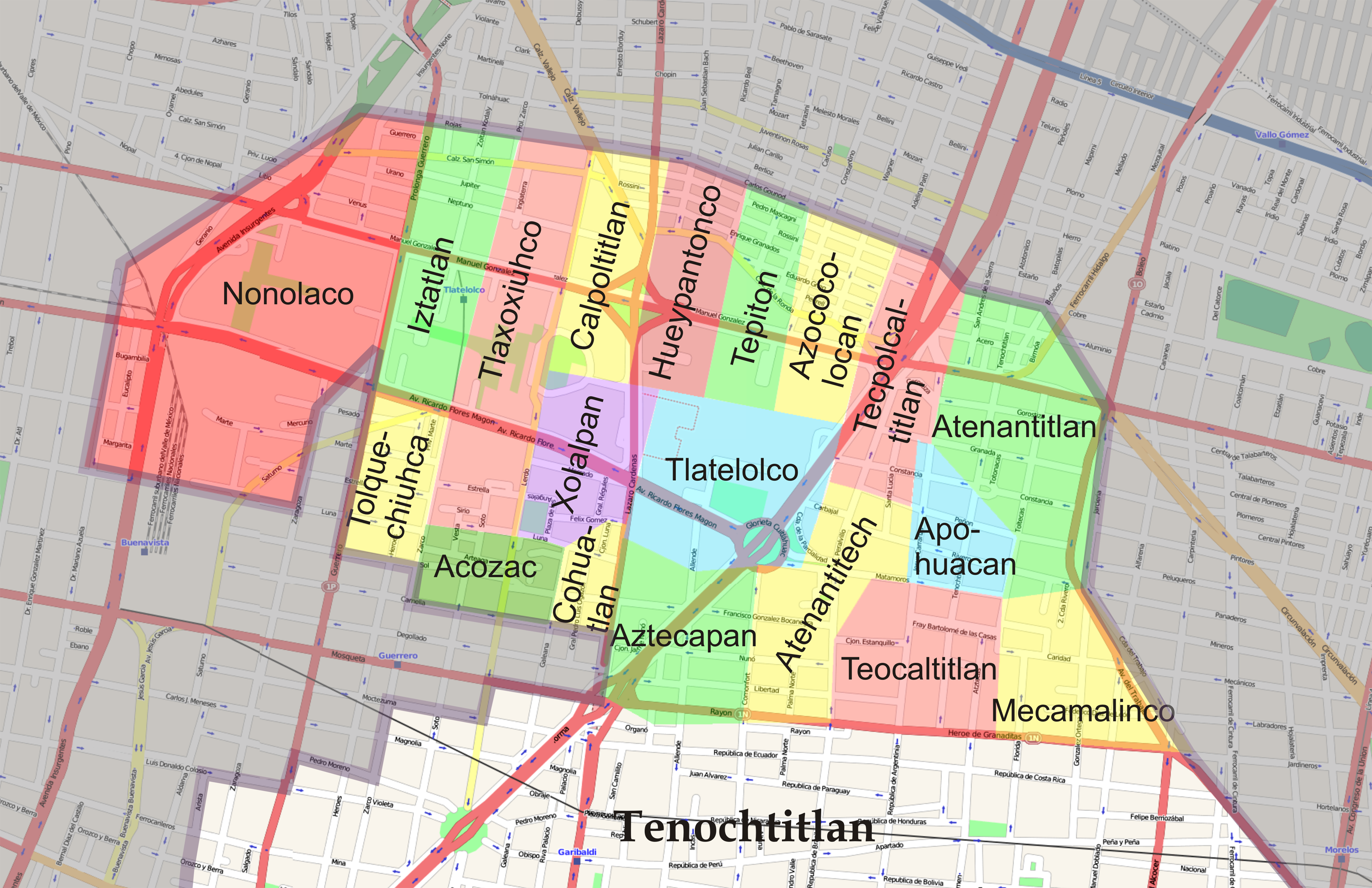
Barrios of pre-conquest Tlatelolco over modern map

In 1337, thirteen years after the foundation of Tenochtitlan, the Tlatelolca declared themselves independent from the Tenochca and inaugurated their first independent tlatoani (dynastic ruler). Under the king Quaquapitzahuac (1376–1417), the first two stages of the Main Pyramid of Tlatelolco were constructed. Under Tlacateotl (1417–1428), the Tlatelolca assisted the Tenochca in the war against the Tepanec empire, dominated by Azcapotzalco. Shortly thereafter, the first war between the Tenochca and Tlatelolca erupted. Also during Tlacateotl's reign, the third stage of the Main Pyramid was constructed. Under Quauhtlatoa (1428–1460), the Tlatelolca conquered the city-state of Ahuilizapan (now Orizaba, Veracruz), and fought against the people of Chalco along with the Tenochca. The fourth and fifth stages of the Main Pyramid were constructed in this period. The ruler Moquihuix (1460–1473) constructed the sixth stage of the temple, but in 1473, in the Battle of Tlatelolco, he was defeated by the Tenochca tlatoani Axayacatl, and Tlatelolco was made subject to Tenochtitlan. Itzcuauhtzin ruled Tlatelolco during a period in which it was almost completely incorporated into Tenochtitlan.

== Marketplace ==
In his Historia verdadera de la conquista de la Nueva España, conquistador Bernal Díaz del Castillo made several observations regarding Tlatelolco. He opined that its temple was the greatest in all of Mexico. Regarding its marketplace, he wrote that the Spanish "were astonished at the number of people and the quantity of merchandise that it contained, and at the good order and control that was maintained, for we had never seen such a thing before." Cortes also wrote that 60,000 buyers and sellers congregated daily at the marketplace. The marketplace in Tlatelolco was the largest marketplace in Mexico, and imported goods from distant regions of Mesoamerica.

== Spanish Conquest ==
During Cortés's siege of Tenochtitlan, the Mexica's would retreat to Tlatelolco and even achieve a successful ambush against the Spanish conquistadores and their allies but would ultimately fall along with the rest of the island to Spain. After the completion of the two-year Spanish Conquest of the Aztec Empire in 1521, the Spanish conquerors established the ruins of Mexico-Tenochtitlan as the Spanish capital of New Spain. The remnants of the indigenous populations of Tenochtitlan and Tlatelolco following the conquest were administered by indigenous elites in the incorporated Indian towns of Santiago Tlatelolco and San Juan Tenochtitlan.

== Spanish Colonization ==
The inhabitants of Tlatelolco viewed themselves as independent from the Mexica and resented the Mexica for losing indigenous territory to the Spanish. Tlatelolco, like other indigenous groups such as the Tlaxcala, resented decades of Mexica domination and sided with the Spanish military in order to dismantle the Mexica Triple Alliance. With Tlatelolco viewing themselves as an independent city state it was easier for them to conform with the Spanish as they took the side of the Spaniards because of their opposition to the Mexica.

== College of Santa Cruz de Tlatelolco ==
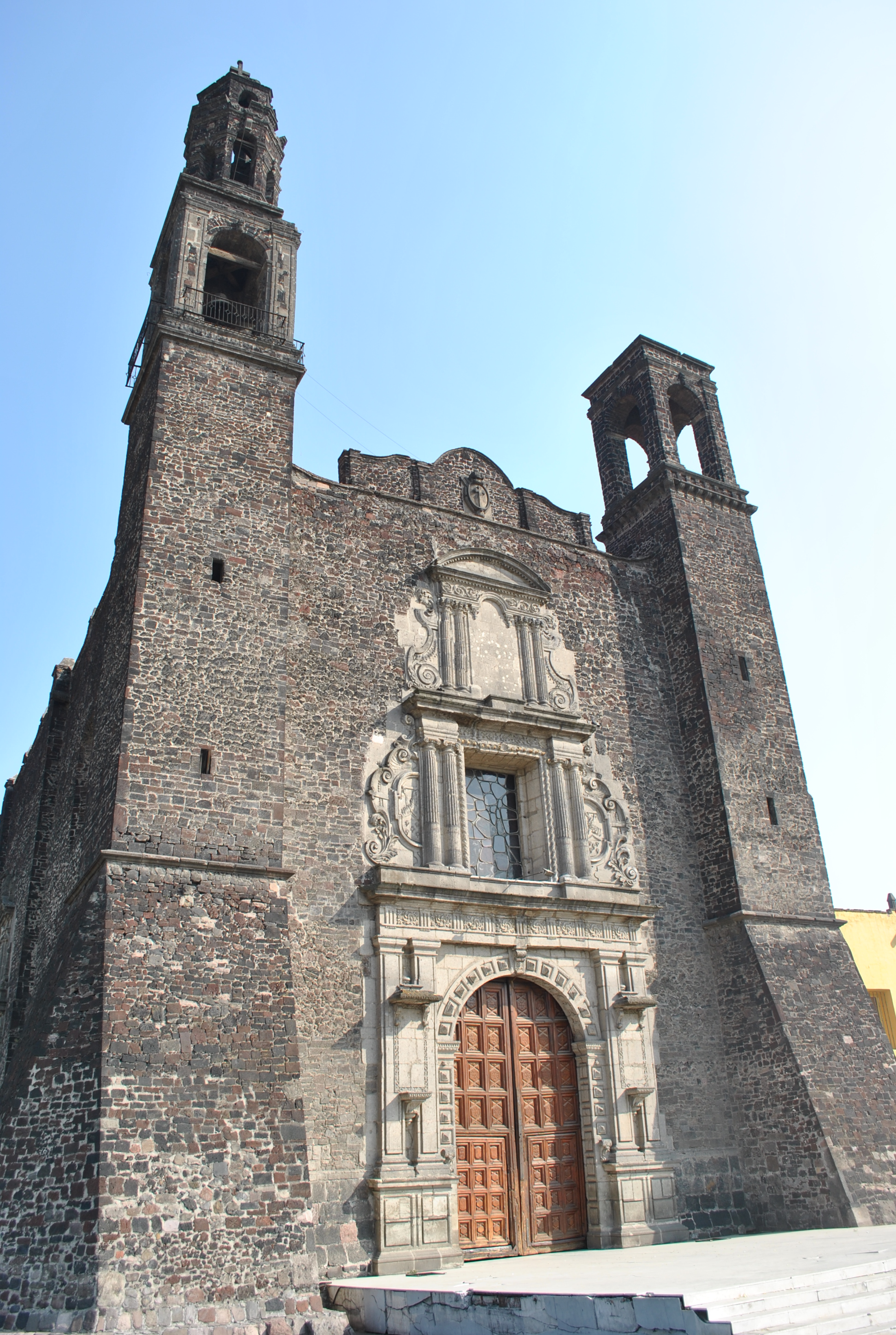
College of Santa Cruz de Tlatelolco

Tlatelolco remained an important location in the colonial era, partly because of the foundation there, of the school for elite indigenous men, the Colegio de Santa Cruz de Tlatelolco, which was the first school of higher learning in the Americas. The foundation of the school was influenced by three powers: The Crown, The Pope and the order of Saint Francis (The Franciscans). The school was the first major school of translators and interpreters in the New World. The school had requirements to be accepted, and these requirements were that a student was to be "an Indian born of a legitimate marriage, from Caciques or noble birth and not of 'macehual', despicable or blemished origin, or marked because of their own vulgar behavior or that of their parents." The college is also notable due to the fact that the writers of the Florentine Codex also attended the College of Santa Cruz de Tlatelolco. Today its remains are located within Mexico City.

== Excavations ==
In the twentieth and twenty-first centuries, archeological excavations have taken place at the Tlatelolco (archaeological site) in what is now part of Mexico City. The excavations of the prehispanic city-state are centered on the Plaza de las Tres Culturas, a square surrounded on three sides by an excavated Aztec site, a 17th-century church called Templo de Santiago, and the modern office complex of the Mexican foreign ministry. In February 2009, the discovery of a mass grave with 49 human bodies was announced by archaeologists. The grave is considered unusual because the bodies are laid out ritually.

== See also ==
- List of rulers of Tlatelolco
- Codex of Tlatelolco
- Tzilacatzin
