= Family tree of Aztec monarchs =

The following is a family tree of the Mexica Emperors from 1376 to 1525.

Tezozomoc; Azcapotzalco ruler 1320–1367/1370–1426	Tezcatlan; Miyahuatzin	Acamapichtli; Tlatoani of Tenochtitlan ?-1376–1395	Tlacacuitlahuatzin; King of Tiliuhcan
Quatlecoatl	Matlalxoch	Tlatolqaca	Matlalxochtzin
Quaquapitzahuac; Tlatoani of Tlatelolco ?-1372–1407	Ayauhcihuatl	Huitzilihuitl; Tlatoani of Tenochtitlan; 1379–1396–1417	Miahuaxihuitl	Cacamacihuatl
Itzcoatl; Tlatoani of Tenochtitlan ?-1427–1440	Huacaltzintli	Matlalatzin	Chimalpopoca; Tlatoani of Tenochtitlan; 1397–1417–1427	Moctezuma I Tlatoani of Tenochtitlan; 1398–1440–1469	Chichimec- acihuatzin I	Tlacaelel; Cihuacoatl; 1397–c.1426-1487
Tezozomoc; Tlatoani of Ecatepec	Tlilpotoncatzin; Cihuacoatl ?-1487–1503	Texcalteuctli	Cacamatzin
Tezozomoc	Atotoztli II	Chichimec- acihuatzin II	Juan Velázquez; Tlacotzin ?-1525–1526	Tlacaelel II; Cihuacoatl ?-1503–1520
Ahuitzotl; Tlatoani of Tenochtitlan ?-1486–1502	Tizoc; Tlatoani of Tenochtitlan ?-1481–1486	Axayacatl; Tlatoani of Tenochtitlan ?-1469–1481	Chalchiuhnenetzin	Moquihuix; Tlatoani of Tlatelolco ?-1460–1473
Chimalpilli II; Tlatoani of Ecatepec	Cuauhtémoc; Tlatoani of Tenochtitlan c.1495–1520- 1521–1525	Cuitláhuac; Tlatoani of Tenochtitlan; 1476–1520	Teotlalco	Moctezuma II; Tlatoani of Tenochtitlan; 1466–1502–1520	Tlapalizquixochtzin; Queen of Ecatepec	Tezozomoctli; Acolnahuacatl
Isabel Moctezuma; 1509–1551	Chimalpopoca; 1480-?	Tlaltecatzin	Diego de Alvarado; Huanitzin; Tlatoani of Tenochtitlan ?-1539–1541-1539

Here is a simplified version of the tree, including the Counts and Dukes of Moctezuma of Tlutengo:

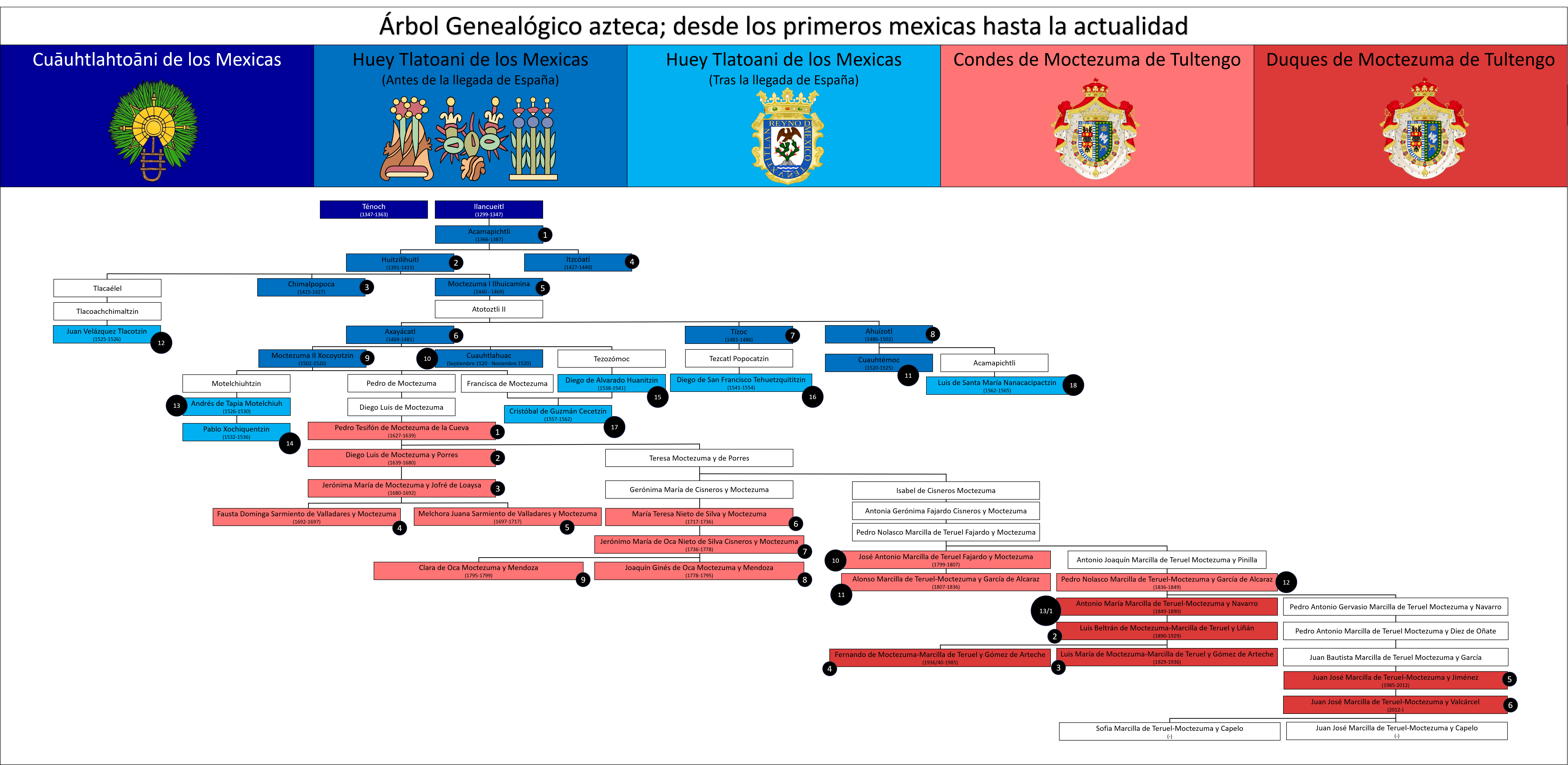

== See also ==
- List of Tenochtitlan rulers
