= Chalchiuhnenetzin =

Aztec princess of Tenochtitlan

Princess of Tenochtitlan, Queen of Tlatelolco

Personal details
- Children: Axayaca
- Parents: Tezozomoc, Prince of Tenochtitlan (father); Atotoztli II (mother)

Chalchiuhnenetzin ('noble jade doll') was an Aztec princess of Tenochtitlan, and a Queen consort of Tlatelolco by marriage to Moquihuix of Tlatelolco. She is foremost known in history for the famous legends about her lovers.

== Biography ==
=== Family ===
She was a daughter of prince Tezozomoc and his cousin, princess Atotoztli II.

She was the sister of the emperors Axayacatl, Tizoc and Ahuitzotl and the aunt of Moctezuma II and Cuitláhuac.

=== Marriage ===
Chalchiuhnenetzin married Moquihuix (d. 1473), king of Tlatelolco, an altepetl, or city-state. She had a son with him, Axayaca, named after her brother.

Moquihuix neglected Chalchiuhnenetzin, preferring the company of other women. Reportedly, he was not attracted to her because she "was quite thin, was not fleshy". He gave the gifts sent to her by her brother to his mistresses, relegated Chalchiuhnenetzin to the position of a concubine, gave her only simple coarse clothing and had her sleeping in a corner; reportedly, he also beat her.

The ill treatment she was subjected to angered her brother, and was given as the reason for why the Aztecs attacked the Kingdom of Tlatelolco in 1473. Her spouse died in the Battle of Tlatelolco, and Tlatelolco was conquered by her brother Axayacatl. After the war she returned to her brother's court.

== Legend ==
Chalchiuhnenetzin is known in history for the famous legend about her lovers. According to the legend, Chalchiuhnenetzin was given her own residence when she married, where she lived with her own court and was visited by her spouse. Allegedly, she sent her servants out to fetch beautiful men for her to be her lovers. As it was prohibited for a woman to have sex outside of marriage, she had her lovers killed after intercourse. Each lover was made into a statue after death, and when her husband visited her and asked her about the statues, she answered that they were statues of her gods.

However, she eventually decided to keep three of her lovers alive. When the king came to visit, he noticed that one of these men was wearing a bracelet he had given his wife. When he decided that he wanted to sleep with her, he noted that she had been replaced in his bed by a statue. He was directed to a room where he discovered Chalchiuhnenetzin committing adultery with her three lovers.

As punishment, Chalchiuhnenetzin, her lovers and her entire household staff were publicly executed. This execution was described as a spectacle and the reason as to why the Aztec king was insulted about the treatment of his sister and decided to attack his brother-in-law.

== Ancestry ==
Family tree of Aztec emperors

Opochtli Iztahuatzin
Acamapichtli
Atotoztli I
Itzcoatl
Matlalxochtzin (tepanec slave)
Tezozomoc
Tlancuitlaatzin
Chalchiuhnenetzin
Acamapichtli
Huitzilihuitl
Tezcatlan Miyahuatzin
Moctezuma I
Tezcacohuatzin
Miahuaxihuitl
Atotoztli II
Tezcacohuatzin
Cuauhtototzin
Chichimecacihuatzin I

== Cultural references ==
Chalchiuhnenetzin is portrayed as the character Jade Doll in the novel Aztec by Gary Jennings, published in 1980. The legend of her lovers and her execution is part of the narrative of the protagonist in the novel's story. In the novel she is married to Nezahualpilli.
