= Tezcacohuatzin =

King of Cuauhnahuac, late fourteenth century; grandfather of Aztec Emperor Moctezuma I

- King of Cuauhnahuac
- Successor: Cuauhtototzin
- Issue: Queen Miahuaxihuitl; King Cuauhtototzin

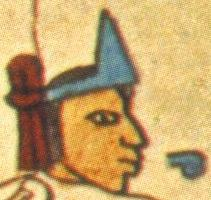
Tezcacohuatzin's grandson Moctezuma I

Tezcacohuatzin (modern Nahuatl pronunciation) (also called Ozomatzin (modern Nahuatl pronunciation) was a king of Cuauhnahuac. He ruled in the late fourteenth century and was a grandfather of Aztec Emperor Moctezuma I and his wife, Chichimecacihuatzin I.

== Biography ==
Tezcacohuatzin was described as one of the most powerful Aztec kings at that time.

It was believed Tezcacohuatzin was a magician. One of the best known Aztec stories regarding him concerns the alliance between the Aztecs and the people of Cuauhnahuac. King Huitzilihuitl of Tenochtitlan wished to ask Tezcacohuatzin (also called Ozomatzin), for his daughter, the Princess Miahuaxihuitl's hand in marriage. But, Tezcacohuatzin, unwilling to let his daughter wed, used his magical powers to call up an army of spiders, centipedes, scorpions, bats, and huge wild beasts to protect her within the high walls of the palace. But in a dream, the god Tezcatlipoca in his invisible Yohualli form told King Huitzilihuitl that marrying Miahuaxihuitl was his destiny. At this point the Tenochca king sent ambassadors with fine words and gifts to convince Cuauhnahuaca king Tezcacohuatzin to allow his daughter to wed. But Tezcacohuatzin told them that Tenochtitlán was a poor, "wretched" place unworthy of his daughter, the princess. Just when all seamed lost, Huitzilihuitl dreamed once more. This time Yohualli told the leader of the Mexica to fashion a hollow, richly decorated arrow in which he was to place a precious stone. Huitzilihuitl travelled to Cuauhnahuac, and there outside the palace walls, drew back his bowstring and let the arrow fly. The arrow sailed over the palace walls and fell into the courtyard where the Princess Miahuaxihuitl happened to be. She picked up the arrow and marveled as she observed the various colors, such as no other arrow possessed. Breaking open the shaft, she beheld the precious stone that shone so brightly. Beguiled, but apparently also quite pragmatic, the princess took the stone between her teeth to test its quality and strength, but in doing so, she accidentally swallowed the stone. In the tradition of so many similar stories, the stone grew within her womb to become the Emperor Moctezuma I, one of the most successful emperors of his time.

The myth bestows divine predestination on what was probably a crassly political move to secure favorable access to Cuernavaca's rich cotton production. Chimalpahin even claims that despite the royal marriage, Tenochtitlan waged war on Cuauhnahuac for forty years, "until its inhabitants were finally conquered." But these rough edges were smoothed away once the actors in the drama assumed the stature of mythical heroes. The increasing Aztec influence in Cuauhnahuac gained sacred legitimacy and the Emperor Moctezuma I, gained a divine birth.

Tezcacohuatzin was father of Queen Miahuaxihuitl and his successor Cuauhtototzin. Miahuaxihuitl was a wife of the Aztec Emperor Huitzilihuitl and the mother of Emperor Moctezuma I.

== Family tree ==
Tezcacohuatzin
Miahuaxihuitl
Moctezuma I
Atotoztli II
Axayacatl, Tizoc and Ahuitzotl

== See also ==
- List of Tenochtitlan rulers
