= Chichimecacihuatzin I =

- Queen consort of Tenochtitlan
- Spouse: Moctezuma I (cousin)
- Issue: Princess Atotoztli II; Princess Chichimecacihuatzin II; Prince Iquehuacatzin? Prince Mahchimaleh?
- Father: Cuauhtototzin

Chichimecacihuatzin I (Nahuatl pronunciation) was a queen consort of Tenochtitlan and an Aztec empress.

== Family ==
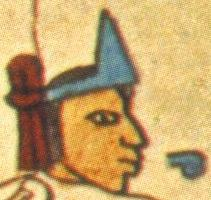
Moctezuma I was both cousin and husband of Chichimecacihuatzin

Chichimecacihuatzin was a daughter of King Cuauhtototzin, granddaughter of King Tezcacohuatzin, niece of Queen Miahuaxihuitl and cousin-wife of Emperor Moctezuma I. She had at least one child with him, Princess Atotoztli II. It is likely she had another daughter, Chichimecacihuatzin II.

It is possible that her sons were Princes Iquehuacatzin and Mahchimaleh.

Chichimecacihuatzin was a grandmother of Emperors Axayacatl, Tizoc, and Ahuitzotl and great-grandmother of Emperors Moctezuma II and Cuitláhuac. Chichimecacihuatzin was also a grandmother of Queen Chalchiuhnenetzin.

== See also ==
- Family tree of Aztec monarchs

== Notes ==
- Factional Competition and Political Development in the New World by Elizabeth M. Brumfiel and John W. Fox

Regnal titles
| Preceded by Wives of Itzcoatl | Queen of Tenochtitlan; 1440–1469 (estimated) | Succeeded by Wives of Axayacatl |
