= Miahuaxihuitl =

- Queen of Tenochtitlan
- Born: Cuauhnahuac
- Spouse: Emperor Huitzilihuitl
- Issue: Emperor Moctezuma I
- Father: King Tezcacohuatzin

Miahuaxihuitl (modern Nahuatl pronunciation) of Cuauhnahuac was a Queen of Tenochtitlan. Her name is also spelled as Miyahuaxihuitl. She was mother of the Princess Matlalcihuatzin and the Aztec Emperor Moctezuma I. She was also an aunt of the Queen Chichimecacihuatzin I and sister of the king Cuauhtototzin.

== Biography ==
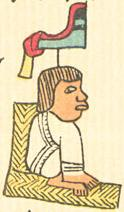
Miahuaxihuitl's son Moctezuma I in the Codex Telleriano-Remensis

Miahuaxihuitl was born a princess, daughter of Tezcacohuatzin, king of Cuauhnahuac. She was known to be very beautiful.

Miahuaxihuitl became a wife of Aztec Emperor Huitzilihuitl. She was greeted with a pomp when she came to Tenochtitlan. She bore a son who would later become Emperor Moctezuma I.

Moctezuma married Miahuaxihuitl's niece Chichimecacihuatzin.

== Family tree ==
Tezcacohuatzin
Miahuaxihuitl
Moctezuma I
Atotoztli II
Axayacatl, Tizoc and Ahuitzotl

== See also ==
- List of Tenochtitlan rulers
- Cacamacihuatl

Regnal titles
| Preceded by Wives of Acamapichtli | Queen of Tenochtitlan; 1396-1417 (estimated) | Succeeded by Wives of Chimalpopoca |
