= Cuauhtototzin =

- King of Cuauhnahuac
- Predecessor: Tezcacohuatzin
- Issue: Chichimecacihuatzin I
- Father: Tezcacohuatzin

Cuauhtototzin (modern Nahuatl pronunciation) was a king of Cuauhnahuac.

== Family ==
Cuauhtototzin was a son and successor of King Tezcacohuatzin. His sister was Empress Miahuaxihuitl.

He was a father of Empress Chichimecacihuatzin I and uncle of her husband Moctezuma I.

Cuauhtototzin was a grandfather of Princess Atotoztli II, who was a mother of kings Axayacatl, Tizoc and Ahuitzotl.

== Family tree ==
Tezcacohuatzin
Cuauhtototzin
Chichimecacihuatzin I
Atotoztli II
Axayacatl, Tizoc and Ahuitzotl

== See also ==
- List of people from Morelos

== Sources ==
- Tlahuica Peoples of Morelos
- Visions of Paradise: Primordial Titles and Mesoamerican History in Cuernavaca by Robert Haskett
