= Tezozomoc (son of Itzcoatl) =

Aztec noble

Tezozomoctzin
- Spouse: Atotoztli II
- Issue: Axayacatl, Tizoc, Ahuitzotl
- Father: Itzcoatl

Tezozomoctzin (Classical Nahuatl: Tezozomoc [tesoˈsomok]) was a son of Itzcoatl, the fourth Aztec ruler (tlatoani) of Tenochtitlan.

Tezozomoctzin never became ruler himself, but he was married to Atotoztli II, daughter of his cousin Moctezuma I (the fifth ruler)

They had three sons that each would become rulers: Axayacatl, Tizoc, and Ahuitzotl — would become the sixth, seventh and eighth rulers, respectively. A fourth son Huitzilihuitl is listed in the genealogy, but was never ruler and has no listed children.

His daughter Chalchiuhnenetzin married Moquihuix, ruler of Tlatelolco altepetl.
