= Atotoztli II =

Atotoztli II Huitzilxochtzin
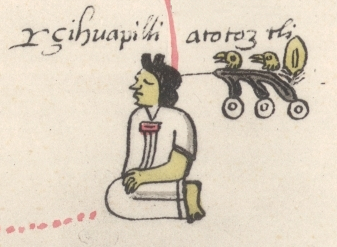
- Fragmento de genealogía de los príncipes mexicanos showing "Lady Atotoztli" (subtitled Çihuapilli Atotoztli in Latin alphabet)

Cihuātlahtoāni of Tenochtitlan
- Reign: 1466–1472
- Predecessor: Moctezuma I
- Successor: Axayacatl
- Born: c. 1410
- Died: c. 1472
- Spouse: Tezozomoc
- Issue: Axayacatl; Tizoc; Ahuitzotl
- Father: Moctezuma I
- Mother: Chichimecacihuatzin I

Atotoztli (Classical Nahuatl: Atotoztli [atoˈtostɬi]) or Huitzilxochtzin (Classical Nahuatl: Huitzilxōchtzin [witsiɬˈʃoːtʃtsin]) was an Aztec princess and possible ruler. She was a daughter of the Aztec emperor Moctezuma I and Chichimecacihuatzin I, the daughter of Cuauhtototzin, the ruler of Cuauhnahuac.

== Life ==
She married Tezozomoc, son of the previous emperor Itzcoatl, and gave birth to three sons who would later become emperors themselves: Axayacatl, Tizoc, and Ahuitzotl.

Some sources indicate she served as tlatoani herself. The Anales de Tula and Relación de la Genealogía state she ruled the Triple Alliance herself, possibly for as long as 30 years. If true, the records of the Mexica may have omitted her from the records because she was a woman. On the other hand, the documents supporting these claims were not contemporary, and made on request of Juan Cano de Saavedra to support the claims of his wife Isabel Moctezuma as heiress to Tenochtitlan.

She may have served as regent for her son Ahuitzotl, who may have been too young to rule upon his grandfather's death. It seems likely she was the tlatoani without the ordinal number, or she held authority along the lines Europeans would describe as a king's regent, because the next ruler after Moctezuma I was her son Axayacatl.

== See also ==
- List of Tenochtitlan rulers
- Aztec emperors family tree
