= Tizoc =

Seventh Tlatoani of Tetonitlan

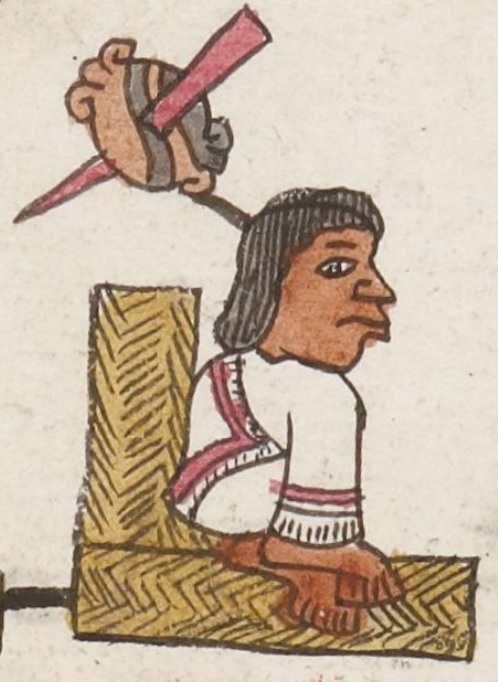
- Tizoc in the Codex Telleriano-Remensis

Huey Tlatoani of the Aztec Empire Tlatoani of Tenochtitlan
- Reign: 2 House – 7 Rabbit (1481–1486)
- Predecessor: Axayacatl
- Successor: Ahuitzotl
- Died: 7 Rabbit (1486)
- Father: Tezozomoc
- Mother: Atotoztli II

Tizocic ([tiˈsosik]), or Tizocicatzin (Nahuatl pronunciation: [tisosiˈkat͡sin̥]), usually known in English as Tizoc, was the seventh tlatoani of Tenochtitlan. His name means, "He who makes sacrifices" or "He who does penance." Either Tizoc or his successor Ahuitzotl was the first tlatoani of Tenochtitlan to assume the title Huey Tlatoani ("supreme tlatoani") to make their superiority over the other cities in the Triple Alliance (Aztec Empire) clear.

== Biography ==
=== Family ===
Tizoc was a son of the princess Atotoztli II and her cousin, prince Tezozomoc. He was a grandson of Emperors Moctezuma I and Itzcoatl. He was a descendant of the King Cuauhtototzin.

He was successor of his brother Axayacatl and was succeeded by his other brother, Ahuitzotl; his sister was the Queen Chalchiuhnenetzin, married to Moquihuix, tlatoani of Tlatelōlco. He was an uncle of Emperors Cuauhtémoc, Moctezuma II and Cuitláhuac and grandfather of Diego de San Francisco Tehuetzquititzin.

=== Reign ===
Most sources agree that Tizoc took power in 1481 (the Aztec year "2 House"), succeeding his older brother. Although Tizoc's reign was relatively short, he began the rebuilding of the Great Pyramid of Tenochtitlan (a task completed by his younger brother in 1487), and also put down a rebellion of the Matlatzincan peoples of the Toluca Valley.

According to the Codex Mendoza, during Tizoc's reign the āltepēmeh of Tonalimoquetzayan, Toxico, Ecatepec, Cillán, Tecaxic, Tolocan, Yancuitlan, Tlappan, Atezcahuacan, Mazatlán, Xochiyetla, Tamapachco, Ecatliquapechco and Miquetlan were conquered.

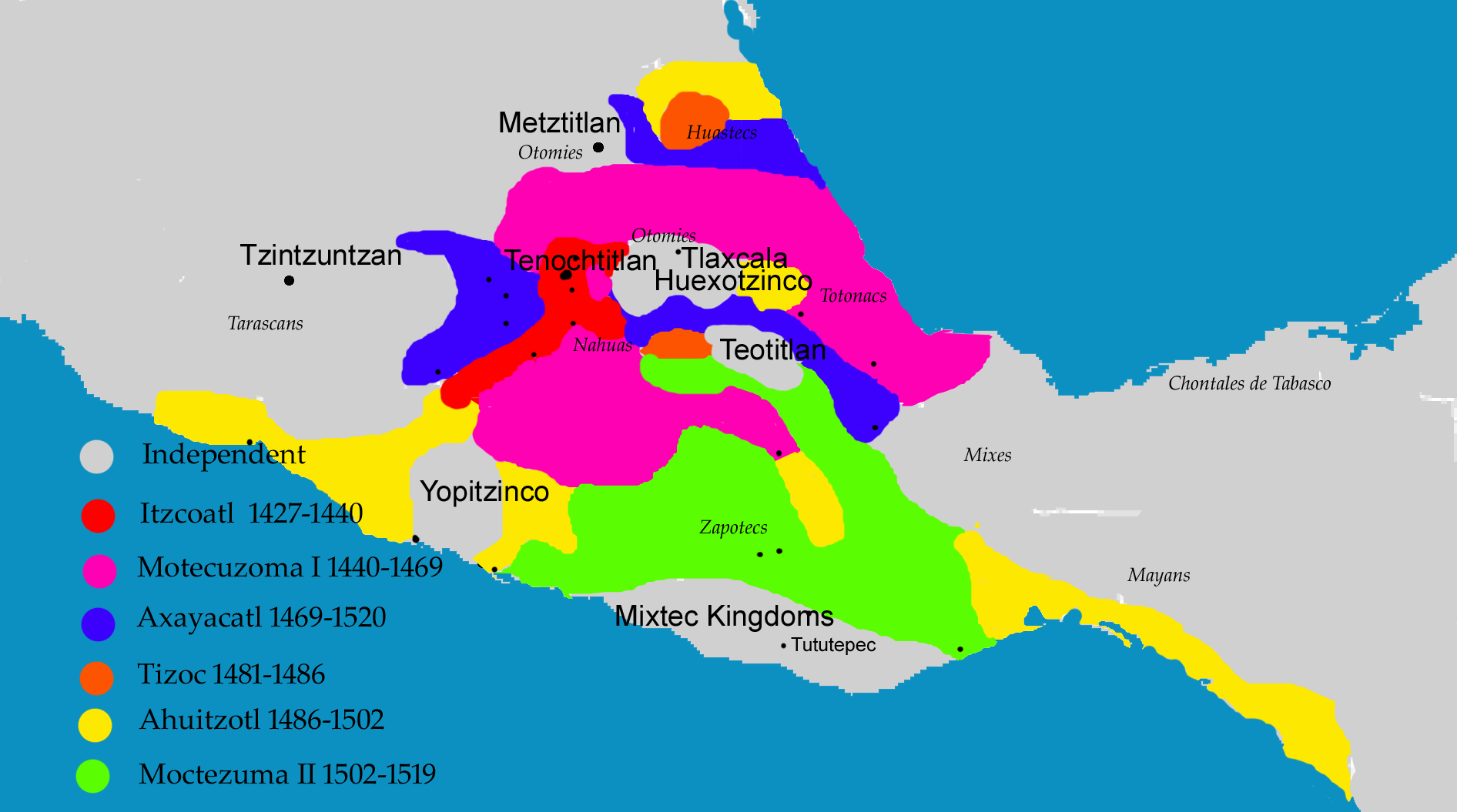
Map showing the expansion of the Aztec empire showing the areas conquered by the Aztec rulers. The conquests of Tizoc is marked by the colour orange.

=== Death ===
Tizoc died in 1486, though it is still somewhat unclear how. Some sources suggest that he was poisoned, others that he fell to illness.

== In popular culture ==
- The Obsidian and Blood series by Aliette de Bodard is set in the last year of the reign of Axayacatl and the first years of the reign of Tizoc, with their youngest brother Ahuitzotl appearing as a primary character. The second book, Harbinger of the Storm is primarily set during the election of Tizoc as tlatoani after the death of Axayacatl.

== See also ==
- List of Tenochtitlan rulers
- Stone of Tizoc

== Notes ==
Regnal titles
Preceded by Axayacatl	Tlatoani of Tenochtitlan; 2 House – 7 Rabbit (1481–1486)	Succeeded by Ahuitzotl
