= Tlatoani =

Ruler of a Mesoamerican āltepētl (city-state)

Tlahtoāni of Aztec Empire
- Sacred war emblem

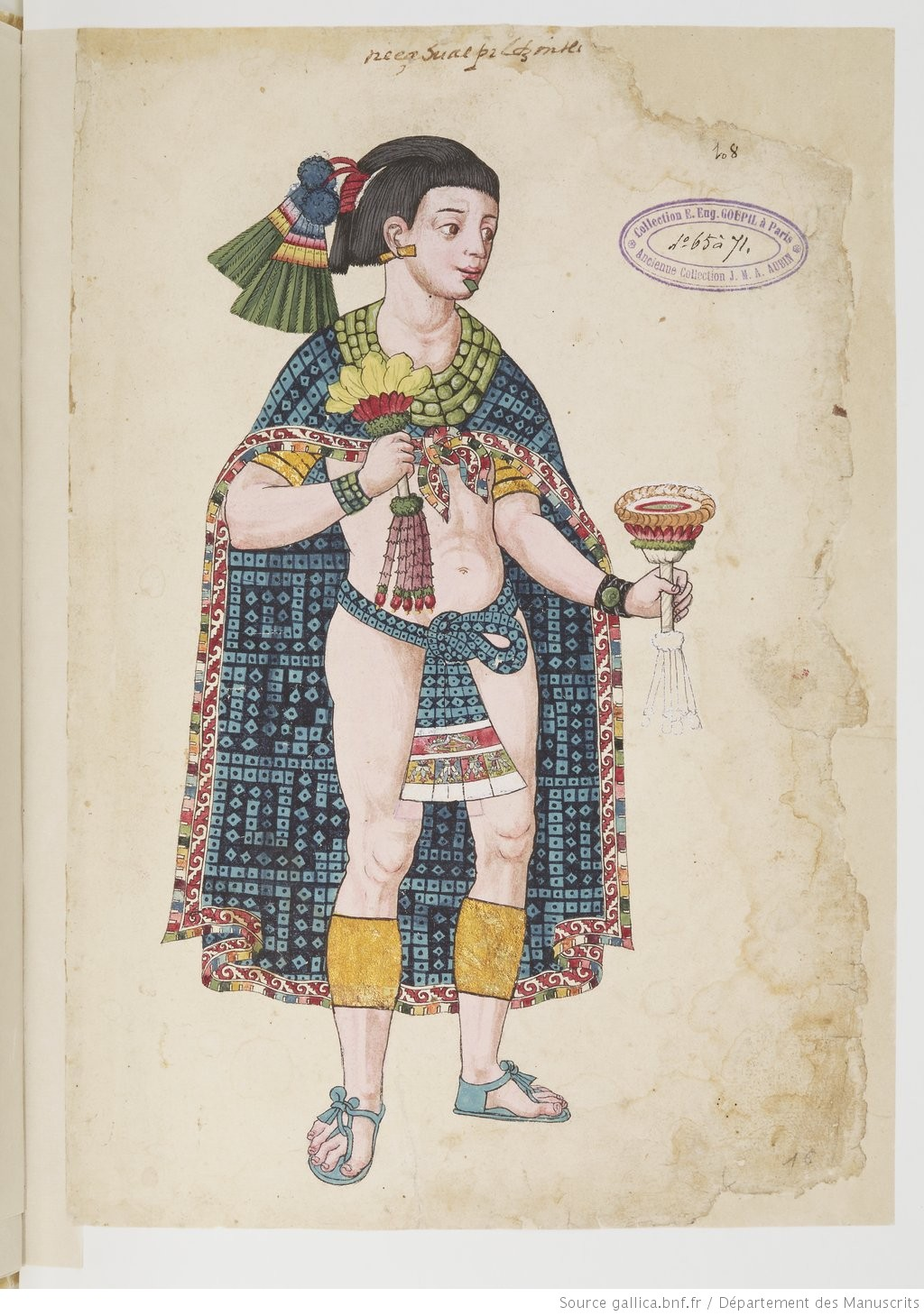
- 17th-century depiction of tlahtoāni Nezahualpiltzintli of Texcoco from the Codex Ixtlilxochitl.

Details
- Style: Huēyi tlahtoāni
- First monarch: Acamapichtli
- Last monarch: Cuauhtémoc
- Formed: c. 1376
- Abolished: 1521
- Residence: Tenochtitlan
- Appointer: Council of Elders

Tlahtoāni (Classical Nahuatl: tlahtoāni pronounced [t͡ɬaʔtoˈaːniˀ], "ruler, sovereign"; plural tlahtohqueh [t͡ɬaʔˈtoʔkeʔ]) is a historical title used by the dynastic rulers of āltepēmeh (singular āltepētl, often translated into English as "city-state"), autonomous political entities formed by many pre-Columbian Nahuatl-speaking peoples in the Valley of Mexico during the Postclassic Period. The title of huēyi tlahtoāni ([ˈweːjiˀ t͡ɬaʔtoˈaːniˀ], "great ruler, emperor") was used by the rulers of the Aztec Empire, an alliance between the āltepēmeh of Tenochtitlan, Tetzcoco, and Tlacopan.

Each āltepētl had its own tlahtoāni who would concurrently function as its ruler, high priest and commander-in-chief. The tlahtoāni wielded ultimate authority over all land within the āltepētl, overseeing tribute collection, market activities, temple affairs, and the resolution of judicial disputes. Typically a dynastic ruler hailing from the royal lineage, the tlahtoāni served for life. However, in certain instances, a council of nobles, elders, and priests could elect a tlahtoāni from a pool of four candidates.

== Etymology ==
The term tlahtoāni ([t͡ɬaʔtoˈaːniˀ]) is an agent noun derived from the verb tlahtoa, meaning "to speak", thereby carrying the literal meaning of "one who speaks". In English, it has been translated variously as "king", "sovereign", "ruler" or, based on its etymology, "speaker". It takes the plural form tlahtohqueh ([t͡ɬaʔˈtoʔkeʔ]), and the construct form *tlahtohcā-, as in tlahtohcāyōtl ("rulership, realm"), tlahtohcātlālli ("royal lands"), and tlahtohcācalli ("royal palace").

Related titles include tlahtohcāpilli ([t͡ɬaʔtoʔkaːˈpilːiˀ]), given to princes and other prominent noblemen, and cihuātlahtoāni ([siwaːt͡ɬaʔtoˈaːniˀ]), used to designate noblewomen including consorts or princesses.

== Commanding hierarchy ==
The cihuācōātl was the second in command after the tlahtoāni, was a member of the nobility, served as the supreme judge for the court system, appointed all lower court judges, and handled the financial affairs of the āltepētl.

== Tlahtoāni during times of war ==
During times of war, the tlahtoāni would be in charge of creating battle plans, and making strategies for his army. He would draft these plans after receiving information from various scouts, messengers, and spies who were sent out to an enemy āltepētl (city-state). Detailed information was presented to him from those reports to be able to construct a layout of the enemy. This was essential because this ensured the safety and success of each battle.

These layouts would be heavily detailed from city structures to surrounding area. The tlahtoāni would be the most informed about any conflict and would be the primary decision maker during war.

He would also be in charge of gaining support from allied rulers by sending gifts and emissaries from his city-state. During warfare the tlahtoāni would be informed immediately of deaths and captures of his warriors. He would also be in charge of informing his citizens about fallen or captive warriors, and would present gifts to the successful ones.

== Tlahtohqueh of Tenochtitlan ==
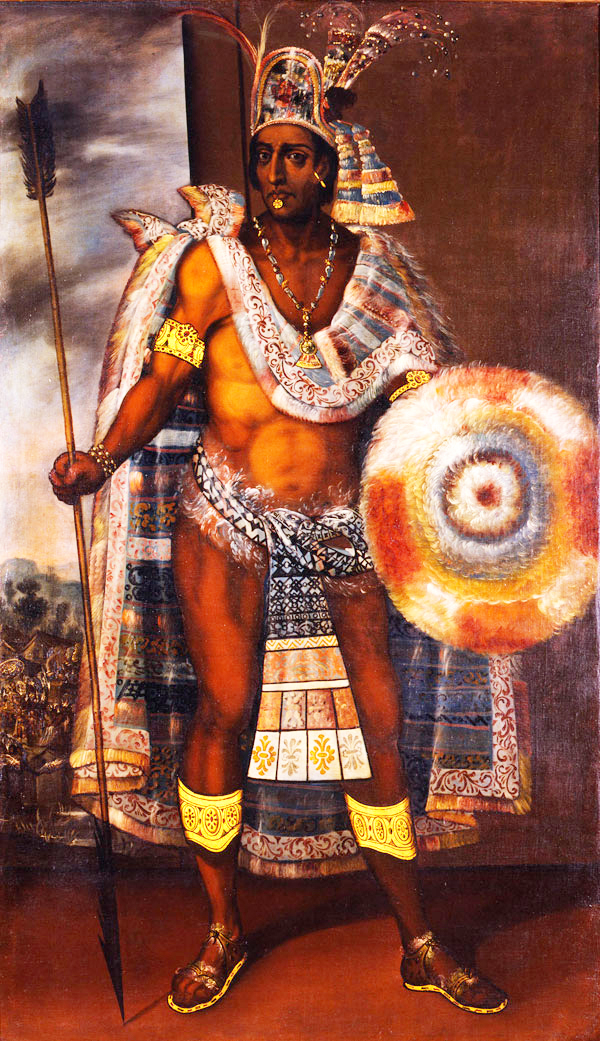
Moctezuma II, sixth huēyi tlahtoāni of the Aztec Triple Alliance

There were eleven tlahtohqueh of Tenochtitlan. Beginning with Itzcoatl, the tlahtoāni of Tenochtitlan was also the huēyi tlahtoāni of the Aztec Empire.

1. Acamapichtli: 1376–1395
2. Huitzilihuitl: 1395–1417
3. Chimalpopoca: 1417–1427
4. Itzcoatl: 1427–1440
5. Moctezuma I: 1440–1469
6. Axayacatl: 1469–1481
7. Tizoc: 1481–1486
8. Ahuitzotl: 1486–1502
9. Moctezuma II: 1502–1520
10. Cuitláhuac: 1520
11. Cuauhtémoc: 1520–1521

== See also ==
- Aztec Emperors family tree
- Aztec Empire
- List of Texcoco rulers
- List of Tlatelolco rulers
- Emperor
