= Axayacatl =

Sixth Tlatoani of Tenochtitlan

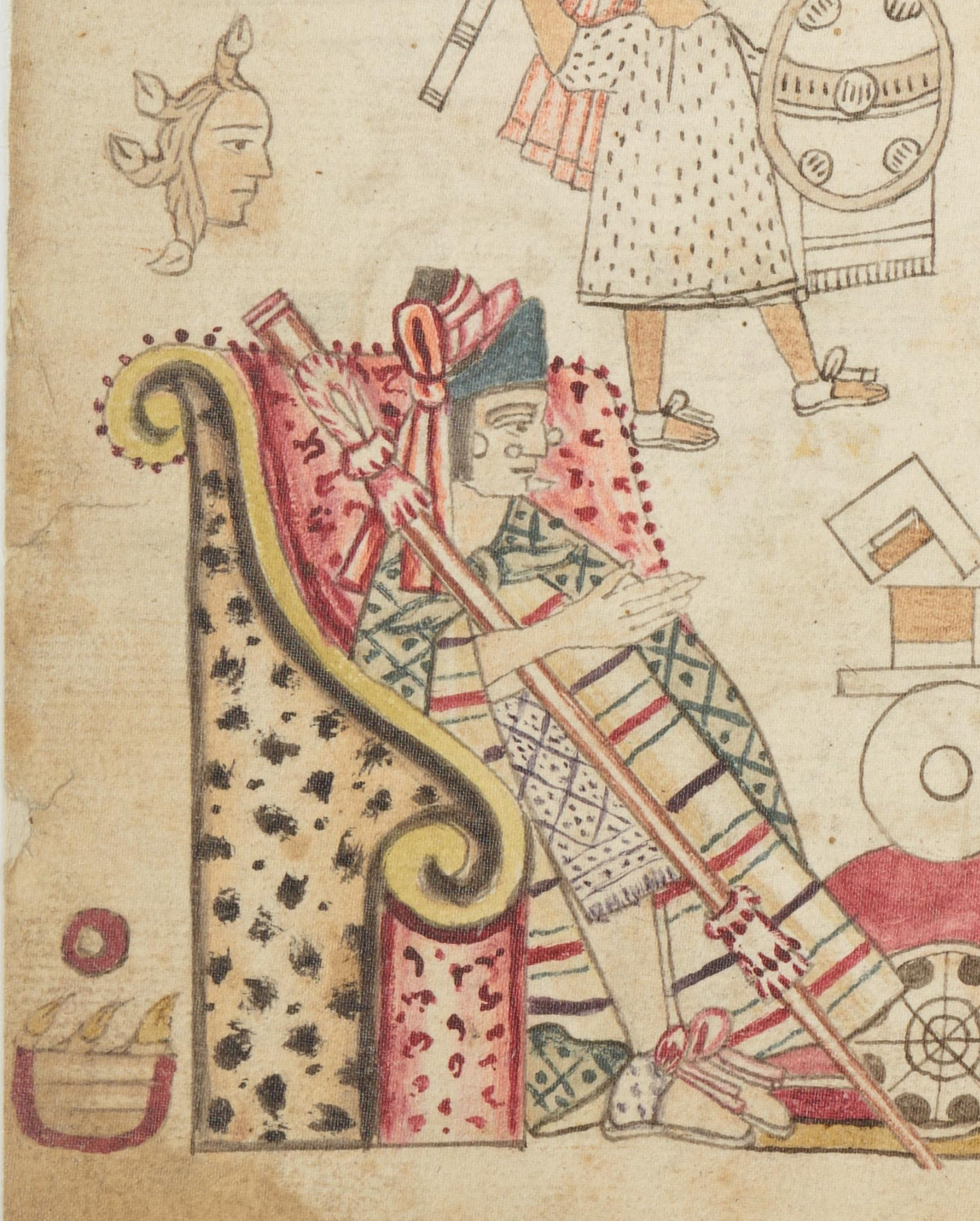
- Axayacatl as depicted in the Codex Azcatitlan

Tlatoani of Tenochtitlan
- Reign: 3 House – 2 House (1469–1481)
- Predecessor: Atotoztli II
- Successor: Tizoc
- Born: c. 1449
- Died: 2 House; 1481 (aged 31–32)
- Spouse: Xochicueyetl
- Issue: Moctezuma II; Cuitláhuac
- Father: Prince Tezozomoc
- Mother: Princess Atotoztli II

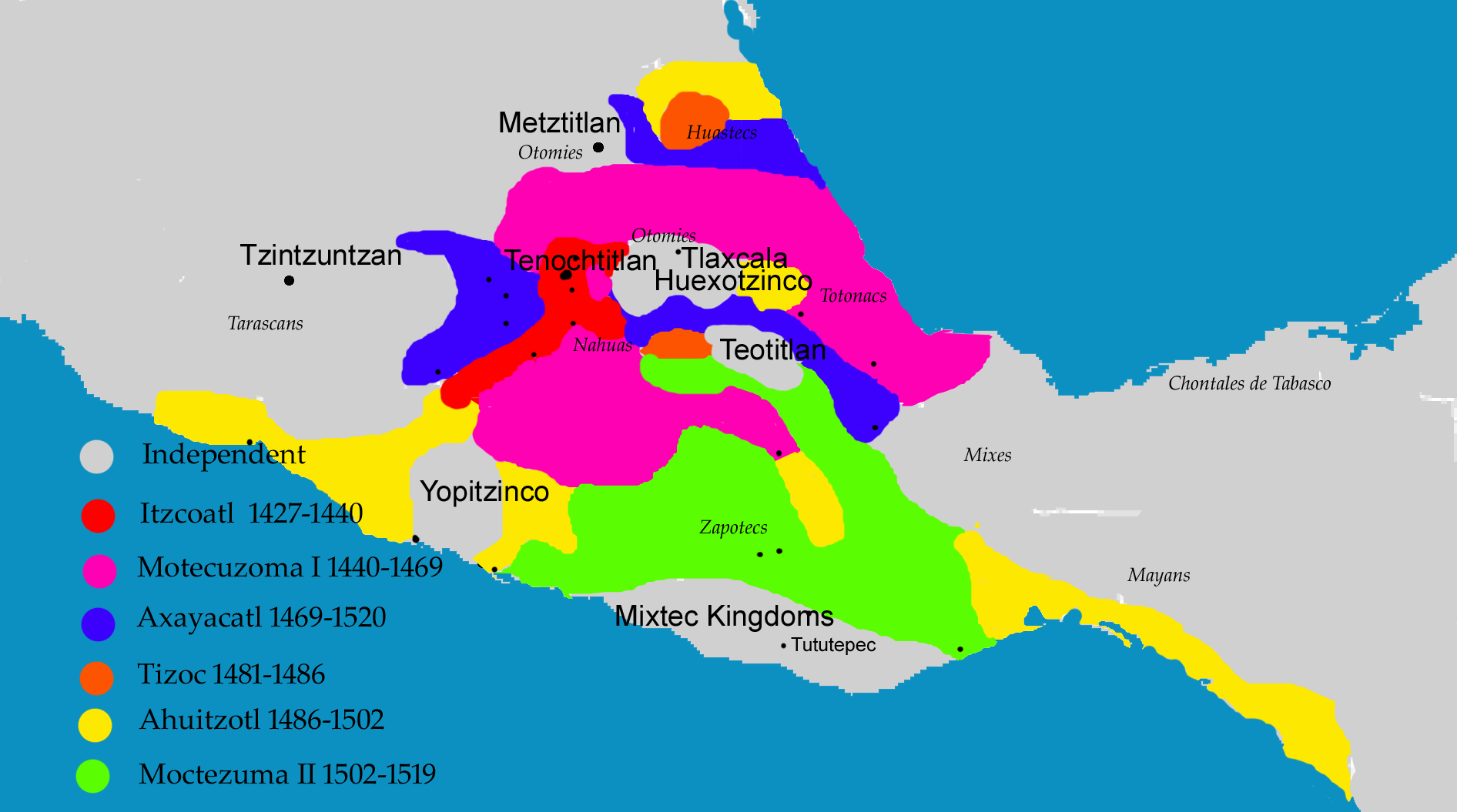
Map showing territorial expansions of the Aztec Empire under each of the Aztec rulers. Expansions during the reign of Axayacatl are indicated in blue.

Axayacatl (/ˌæʃəˈjɑːkətəl/; Classical Nahuatl: āxāyacatl [aːʃaːˈjákatɬ]; Spanish: Axayácatl [axaˈʝakatɬ]; meaning "face of water"; c. 1449–1481) was the sixth tlatoani of the altepetl of Tenochtitlan and Emperor of the Aztec Triple Alliance.

== Biography ==
=== Early life and background ===
Axayacatl was a son of the princess Atotoztli II and her cousin, prince Tezozomoc. He was a grandson of the Emperors Moctezuma I and Itzcoatl. He was a descendant of the king Cuauhtototzin.

He was a successor of Moctezuma and his brothers were Emperors Tizoc and Ahuitzotl and his sister was the Queen Chalchiuhnenetzin. He was an uncle of the Emperor Cuauhtémoc and father of Emperors Moctezuma II and Cuitláhuac.

=== Rise to power ===
During his youth, his military prowess gained him the favor influential figures such as Nezahualcoyotl and Tlacaelel I, and thus, upon the death of Moctezuma I in 1469, he was chosen to ascend to the throne, much to the displeasure of his two older brothers, Tizoc and Ahuitzotl.

It is also important that the Great Sun Stone, also known as the Aztec Calendar, was carved under his leadership. An earthquake in Tenochtitlán occurred and destroyed many homes.

=== Military actions and death ===
Using as a pretext the insulting behavior of a few Tlatelolcan citizens, Axayacatl invaded his neighbor, killed its ruler, Moquihuix, and replaced him with a military governor. The Tlatelolcans lost any voice they had in forming Aztec policy.

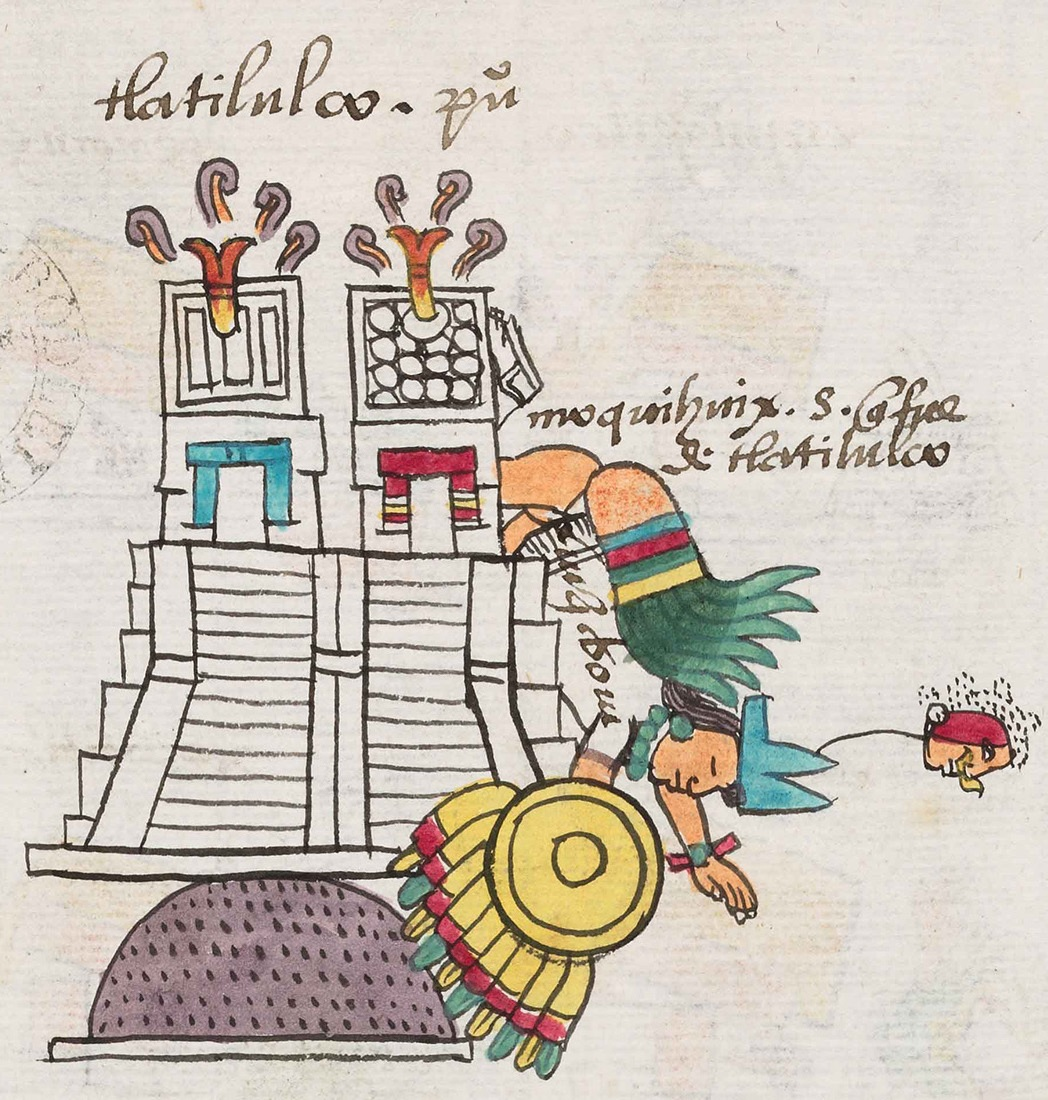
Moquihuix's death as depicted in the Codex Mendoza.

Axayacatl largely dedicated his twelve-year reign to consolidating his militaristic repute: he led successful campaigns against the neighboring altepetl of Tlatelolco in 1473 (see Battle of Tlatelolco) and the Matlatzinca of the Toluca Valley in 1474, but was finally defeated by the Tarascans of Michoacán in 1476. Despite some subsequent minor triumphs, Axayacatl's defeat at the hands of the Tarascans irreversibly marred his image, as it constituted the only major defeat suffered by the Aztecs up to that moment. In spite of his young age, he fell gravely ill in 1480, dying a mere year later, in 1481, whereupon he was succeeded by his brother Tizoc.

=== Axayacatl the poet ===
Axayacatl wrote two poems. The first, Ycuic Axayayatzin (English: "Song of Axayacatl") is a defense against his brothers and critics; the second, Huehue cuicatl (English: "Song of the Ancients") is a lament written after his defeat in Michoacan.

== In popular culture ==
- The Obsidian and Blood series by Aliette de Bodard are set in the last year of the reign of Axayacatl and the first years of the reign of Tizoc, with their youngest brother Ahuitzotl appearing as a primary character.

== See also ==
- List of Tenochtitlan rulers

Regnal titles
Preceded by Moctezuma I	Tlatoani of Tenochtitlan; 3 House – 2 House (1469–1481)	Succeeded by Tizoc
