= Ahuitzotl =

Tlatoani of Tenochtitlan from 1486 to 1502

Ahuizotl
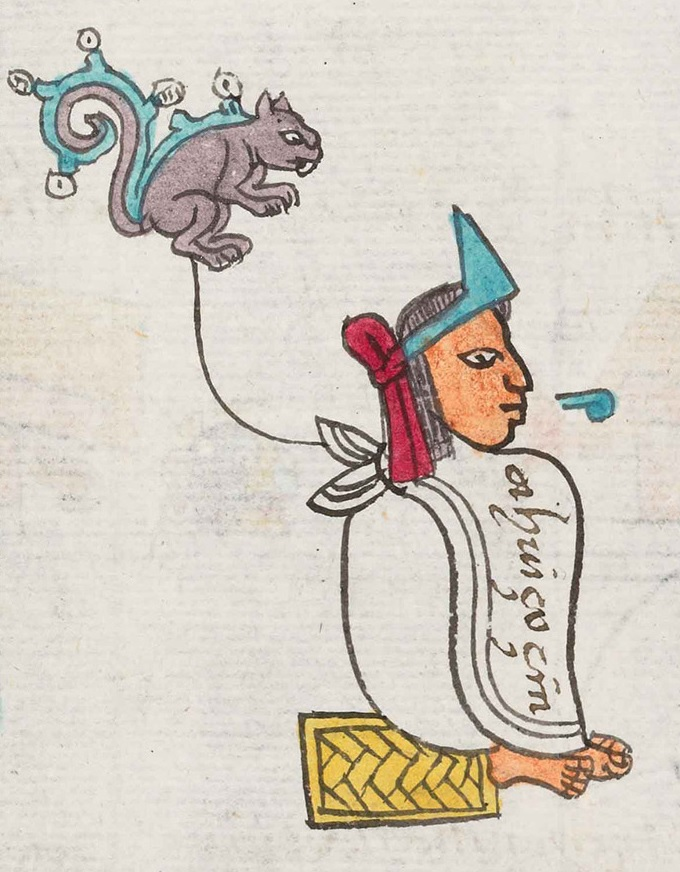
- Ahuitzotl depicted in the Codex Mendoza

Huey Tlatoani of the Aztec Empire Tlatoani of Tenochtitlan
- Reign: 7 Rabbit (1486) – 10 Rabbit (1502)
- Predecessor: Tizoc
- Successor: Moctezuma II
- Born: 15th century Tenochtitlan, Aztec Triple Alliance
- Died: 10 Rabbit (1502); Tenochtitlan, Aztec Triple Alliance
- Issue: Chimalpilli II; Cuauhtémoc; Unidentified daughter
- Father: Tezozomoc
- Mother: Atotoztli II
- Religion: Aztec polytheism

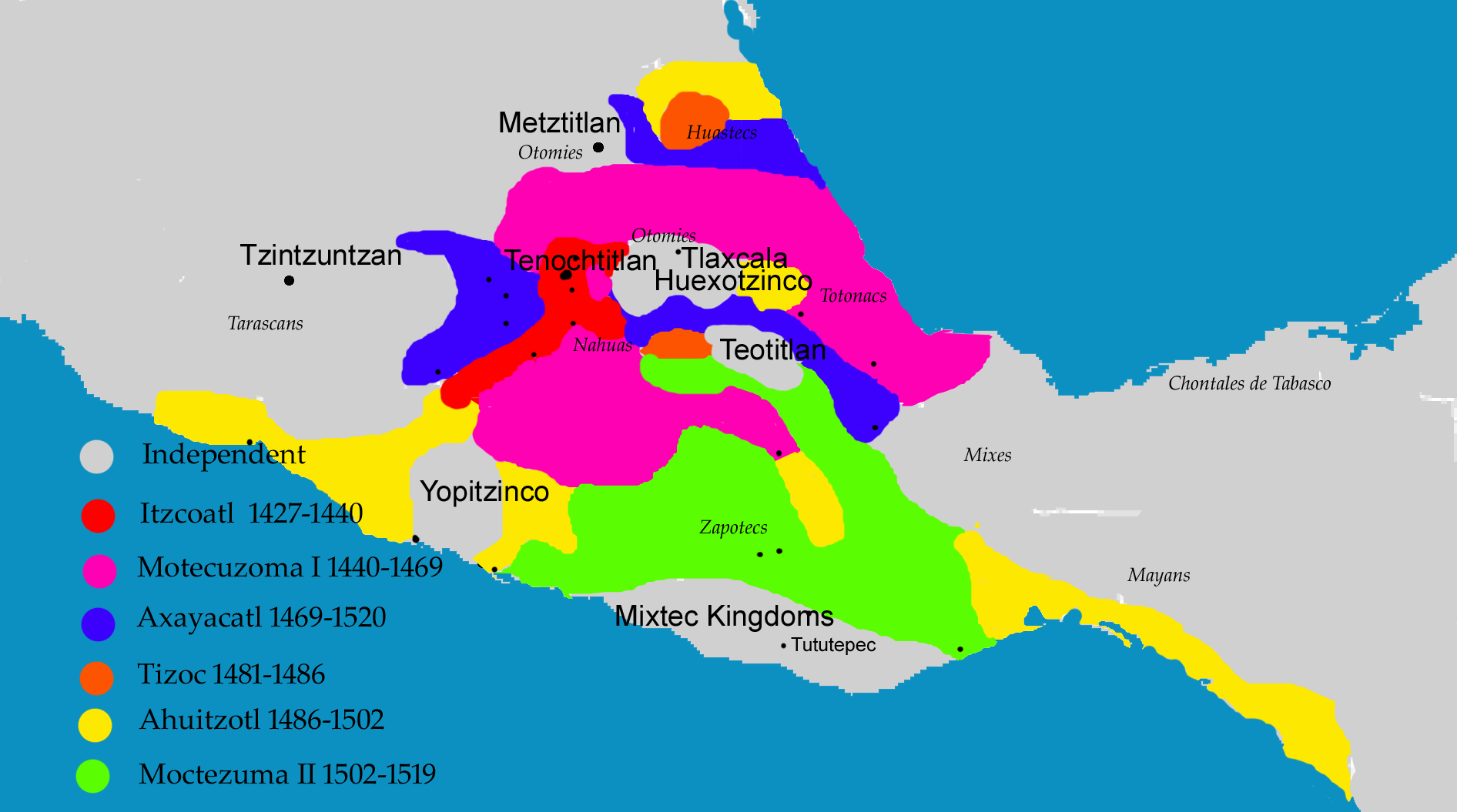
Map showing the expansion of the Aztec Triple Alliance. The conquests of Ahuitzotl are marked in yellow.

Ahuitzotl (Nahuatl languages: āhuitzotl, Nahuatl pronunciation: [aːˈwit͡sot͡ɬ]) was the eighth Aztec ruler, the Huey Tlatoani of the city of Tenochtitlan, son of princess Atotoztli II. His name literally means "Water Thorny" and was also applied to the otter. It is also theorized that more likely, the animal called ahuitzotl is actually the water opossum, the hand symbolizing its prehensile tail, which otters notably lack.

Either Ahuitzotl or his predecessor Tizoc was the first tlatoani of Tenochtitlan to assume the title Huey Tlatoani ("supreme tlatoani") to make their superiority over the other cities in the Triple Alliance (Aztec Empire) clear. Ahuitzotl was responsible for much of the expansion of the Mexica domain, and consolidated the empire's power after emulating his predecessor. He took power as Emperor in the year 7 Rabbit (1486), after the death of his predecessor and brother, Tizoc.

He had two sons, the kings Chimalpilli II and Cuauhtémoc, and one daughter.

== Biography ==
Perhaps the greatest known military leader of pre-Columbian Mesoamerica, Ahuizotl began his reign by suppressing a Huastec rebellion, and then swiftly more than doubled the size of lands under Aztec dominance. He conquered the Mixtec, Zapotec, and other peoples from Pacific Coast of Mexico down to the western part of Guatemala. Ahuizotl also supervised a major rebuilding of Tenochtitlan on a grander scale including the expansion of the Great Pyramid or Templo Mayor in the year 8 Reed (1487).

He presided over the introduction of the great-tailed grackle into the Valley of Mexico, the earliest documented case of human-mediated bird introduction in the Western Hemisphere.

Ahuizotl died in the year 10 Rabbit (1502) and was succeeded by his nephew, Moctezuma II.

Ahuizotl took his name from the animal ahuizotl, which the Aztecs considered to be a legendary creature in its own right rather than a mere mythical representation of the king.

== Legacy ==
Ahuitzotl, along with his grandson Itzcoatl, is commemorated by one of the bronze statues that constitute the Monumento a los Indios Verdes, currently located in Gustavo A. Madero, Mexico City, and originally created for the 1889 Paris Exposition.

== In popular culture ==
Under the name Teomitl, Ahuitzotl is a primary character in the Obsidian and Blood series by Aliette de Bodard, which are set in the last year of the reign of Axayacatl and the first years of the reign of Tizoc.

In the historical fiction novel Aztec by Gary Jennings, Ahuitzotl is a prominent character. Set in the time just before the arrival of the Spanish Conquistadors, it accounts his construction of the many expansions of Tenochtitlan, and wars of conquest, trade, and proclivities.

== General and cited references ==
- Hassig, Ross (1988). Aztec Warfare: Imperial Expansion and Political Control. Norman, OK: University of Oklahoma Press.
- Townsend, Richard F. (2000). The Aztecs (revised ed.). New York: Thames and Hudson.
- Weaver, Muriel Porter (1993). The Aztecs, Maya, and Their Predecessors: Archaeology of Mesoamerica (3rd ed.). San Diego: Academic Press. ISBN 978-0-01-263999-3.

Preceded by Tizoc	Ruler of Tenochtitlan; Ruler of the Aztec Triple Alliance; 7 Rabbit – 10 Rabbit (1486–1502)	Succeeded by Moctezuma II
