= Maria Bartola =

Early indigenous historian of Mexico

Maria Bartola was a 16th-century Aztec woman and is referred to as the first historian of Mexico.

Moctezuma II, ruler of the Aztec Empire prior to the arrival of Spanish conquistadors, had a brother named Cuitláhuac. When Moctezuma II was killed in the battles against Hernán Cortés, Cuitláhuac became his successor. Cuitláhuac died early into his tenure. His daughter Maria Bartola, so christened by the Spanish, lived on through the violent period of the Spanish siege of the Aztec capital city, Tenochtitlan.

Through her own experiences witnessing this siege, sometimes from the battle field itself, “she began to write a history of her time.” Unfortunately, her writing has not survived for the Spaniards burned it. It is thanks to historian Fernando de Alva Cortés Ixtlilxochitl that we know of her work and of her.
