= Monument to Cuauhtémoc =

Sculpture in Mexico City, Mexico

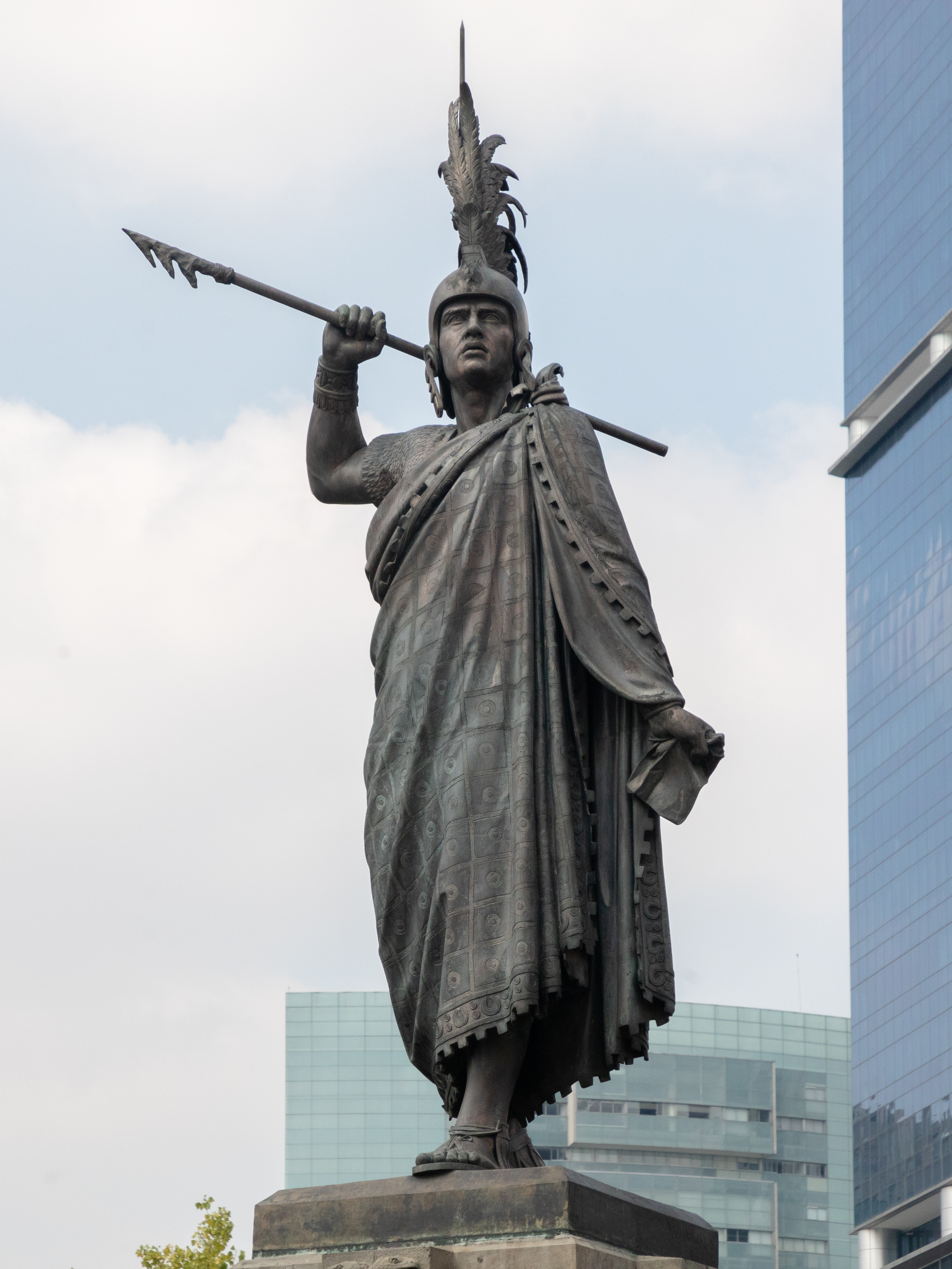
- Front view of the top section of the statue
- Interactive map of Monument to Cuauhtémoc
- Location: Paseo de la Reforma, Mexico City
- Coordinates: 19.4311°N 99.1589°W
- Designer: Francisco Jiménez, Ramón Agea, Miguel Noreña
- Width: 6.20 x 6.20 m (base)
- Height: 4.93 metres (16.2 ft) (sculpture); 11.75 metres (38.5 ft) (base)
- Beginning date: 1878
- Completion date: 1887
- Opening date: 21 August 1887
- Dedicated to: Cuauhtémoc

The Monument to Cuauhtémoc is an 1887 monument dedicated to the last Mexica ruler (tlatoani) of Tenochtitlan Cuauhtémoc, located at the intersection of Avenida de los Insurgentes and Paseo de la Reforma in Mexico City. It is the work of Francisco Jiménez and Miguel Noreña in the "neoindigenismo" (academic indigenismo style), and was proposed to promote the new government of Porfirio Díaz.

== Historical context ==
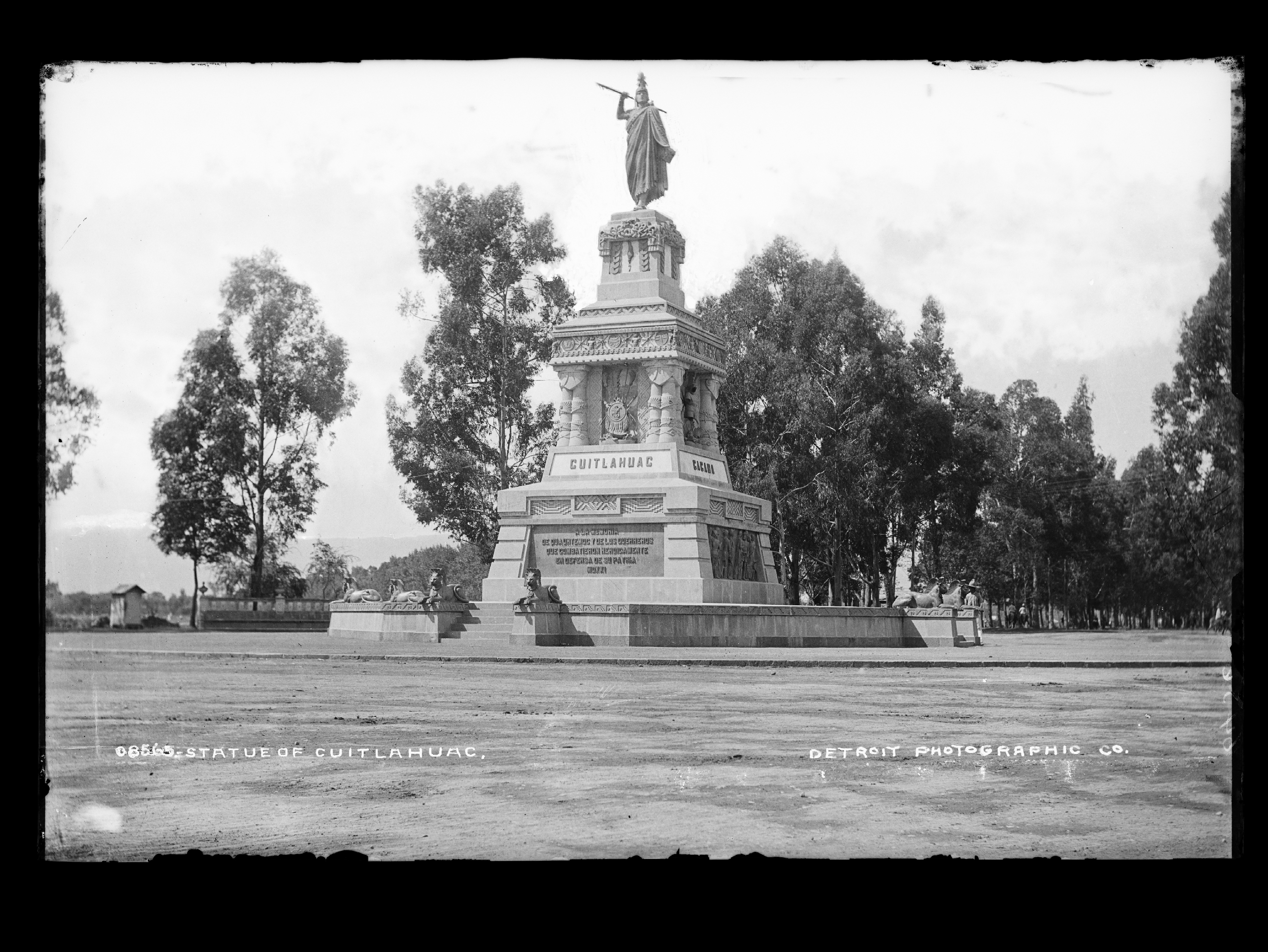
The monument c. 1880 by William Henry Jackson.

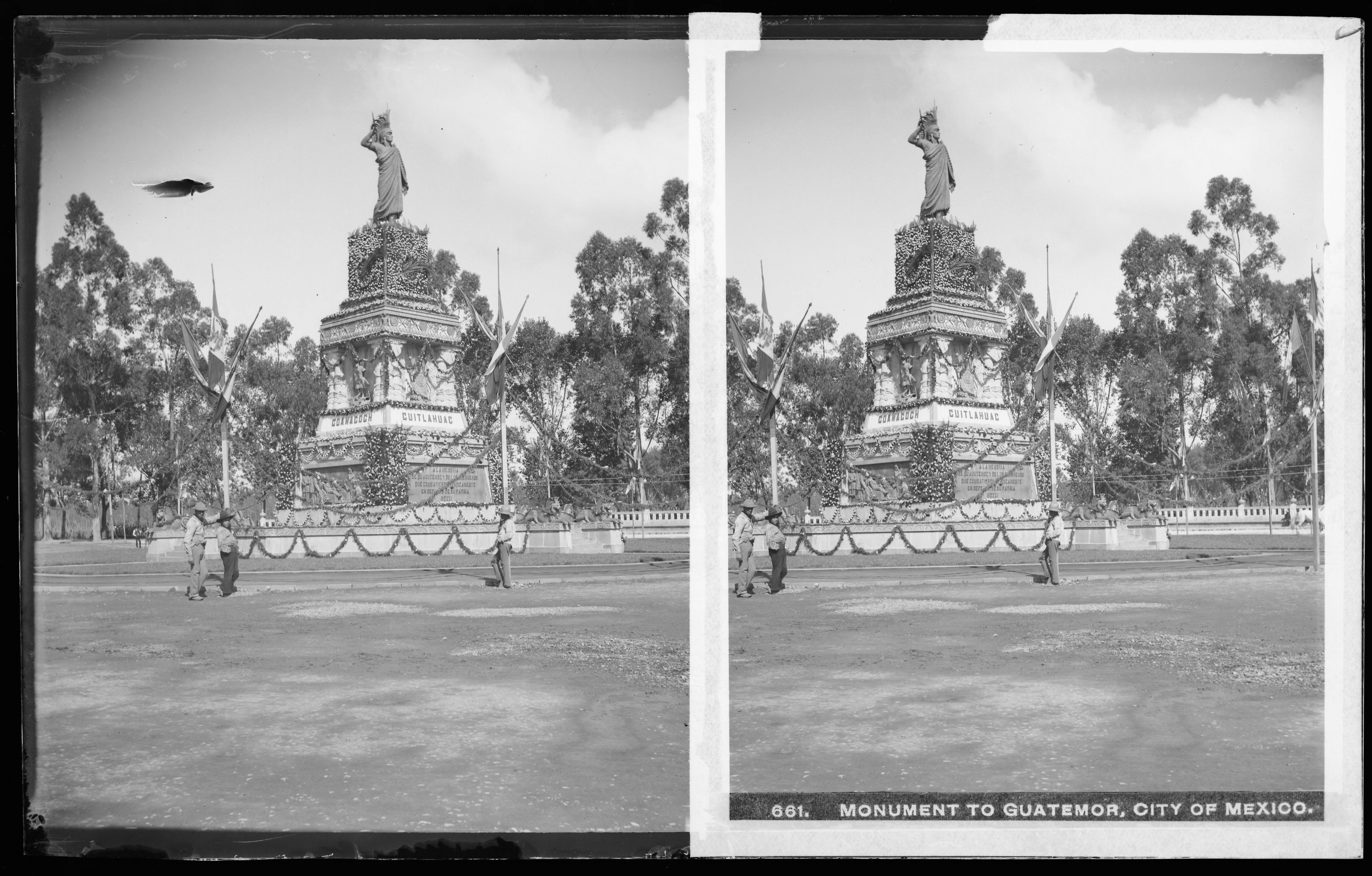
Stereograph of monument c. 1905-1910 by William Henry Jackson.

The construction of the monument was part of a nationalist discourse, promoted through a program of public sculpture and an expansion of the Paseo de la Reforma. Its construction occurred subsequent to the Monument to Christopher Columbus, located at the next major roundabout (glorieta) of the same wide avenue, and in contrast to it, as an attempt to highlight the mestizo (mixed origin) identity of contemporary Mexico. It is also deliberately made in the same scale as monuments celebrating national heroes from the 19th century Mexican War of Independence. Alongside the Mexico Pavilion at the 1889 Paris exhibition by Antonio Anza, the monument was part of a failed search for a purely Mexican artistic style.

The monument to Cuauhtémoc was created on the initiative of Vicente Riva Palacio who proposed to promote the "Porfiriato" regime of president Porfirio Díaz with a monument to honour the last of the Mexica rulers. To do this, in 1877 D.J.S. Bagally, Emilio Dondé, Manuel Gargollo y Parra and Ramón Rodríguez Arangoyti were convened as judges for a public competition. The winners was engineer Francisco M. Jiménez who were inspired by the details of before colonial European Mexican architecture, such as the ancient buildings of Uxmal, Mitla and the archaeological site of Palenque, among others. Jimenez died two days after the decision was announced therefore the construction of the monument was overseen by Ramón Agea, architect and engineer of the National Palace of Mexico. The Minister of public works, Carlos Pacheco Villalobos, then commissioned Miguel Noreña for sculptures on the monument at a cost of 37,863 pesos. 3 thousand was later added to the cost for the bronze leopards around the base as these had originally been planned by Jiménez to only be built in chiluca stone.

The foundation stone was laid on 5 May 1878 a date chosen by Diaz in recognition of the Battle of Puebla. It was opened nine years later on 21 August 1887 by Diaz. The casting was made in the workshop of Jesús Contreras and weights 354 tons.

== Location ==
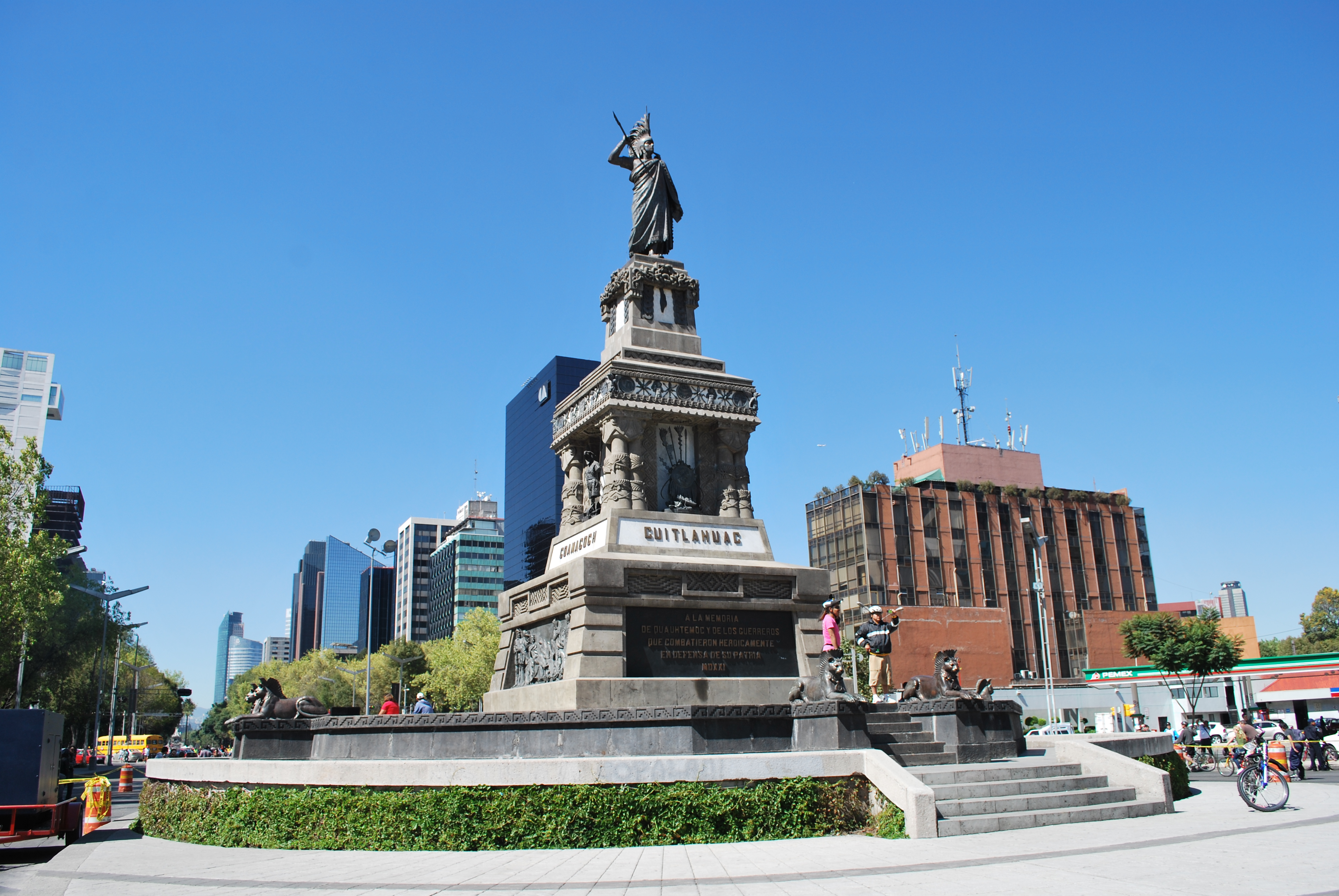
The monument in its current location as seen from the East. The name Cuitláhuac is visible on the inscription - Cuauhtémoc's cousin and predecessor as Tlatoani of Tenochtitlan (2011)

In 1949 architect Mario Pani Darqui had planned to build a huge square with traffic intersection and at least a dozen new buildings with the monument as the center of the project. The Mexico City Government moved the monument from its original location to the middle of the intersection of Paseo de la Reforma and Avenida de los Insurgentes as the first stage of the construction but the project was not completed. In 2004 as a part of a major restoration of the Paseo, the Mexico City government decided move it back to its original site. Restoration works of the base, sculptures and the construction of the new environs took place beginning on April 12, 2004. For this new site, the local government and the National Institute of Anthropology and History undertook research to confirm the original site - 79 meters to the northwest of the location in 1949. In the new site a stronger foundation for the monument was built, which also gave the monument an elevation 1.8m higher than the original. The renovation was completed with the placement of the Cuauhtémoc statue on December 10, 2004.

The monument is now situated in the middle of a roundabout (glorieta) in the city's main boulevard with "Glorieta of the Palm" at the next intersection to the West and glorieta de las mujeres que luchan (former location of the Columbus monument) at the next intersection to the East.

== Sculpture ==
The monument is topped by a statue of Cuauhtémoc, wearing ceremonial clothing with a penacho (plumed headdress) and holding a spear, made by the Mexican sculptor Miguel Noreña. The costume and the anatomical arrangement of Cuauhtémoc - made to resemble statues of the Greco-Roman tradition, following the artistic fashion of the time. The tilmàtli (outer garment) is knotted the Roman style, for example. According to Arturo Arnaiz y Freg, poet Ignacio Manuel Altamirano was the model for the Cuauhtémoc face.

== Base ==
Designed by Francisco Jiménez, the base of the monument incorporates many Mesoamerican stylistic elements including an octagonal shape, consisting of three truncated pyramidal bodies. The third one shows influence of complex slope/board and contains friezes inspired by the architecture of Mitla.

On the four sides of monument are names of other Aztec commanders during the Spanish conquest: Cuitláhuac (East), Cacama (North), Tetlepanquetzaltzin (originally Tetlepanquetzal, West) and Coanacoch (South).

The base also includes two inscriptions:

In memory of Quautemoc [sic] and the warriors who fought heroically in defense of their homeland. MDXXI [1521]
(Original: A la memoria de Quautemoc y de los guerreros que combatieron heroicamente en defensa de su patria. MDXXI)

The erection of this monument was ordered by Porfirio Diaz, President of the Republic, and Vicente Riva Palacio, Secretary of Public Works. MDCCCLXXVIII [1878]
(Original: Ordenaron la erección de este monumento Porfirio Díaz, presidente de la República, y Vicente Riva Palacio, secretario de Fomento. MDCCCLXXVIII)

The reliefs on the North and South of the pedestal represent The meeting of Cuauhtémoc prisoner with Cortés (original: La entrevista de Cuauhtémoc, prisionero, con Cortés), by Miguel Noreña and The torment of Cuauhtémoc (original: El tormento de Cuauhtémoc) by Gabriel Guerra.

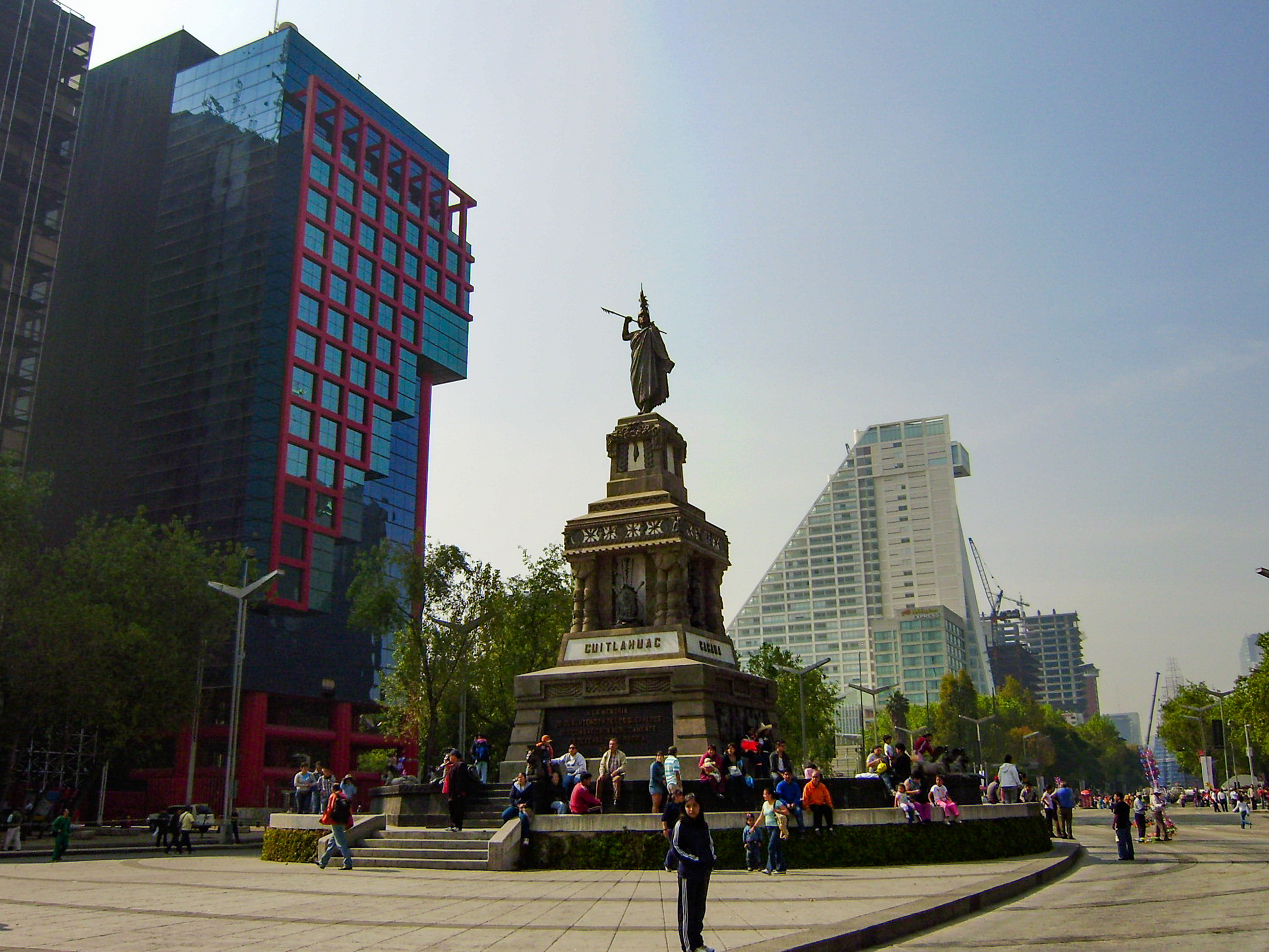
The monument with Reforma 222 in the background.

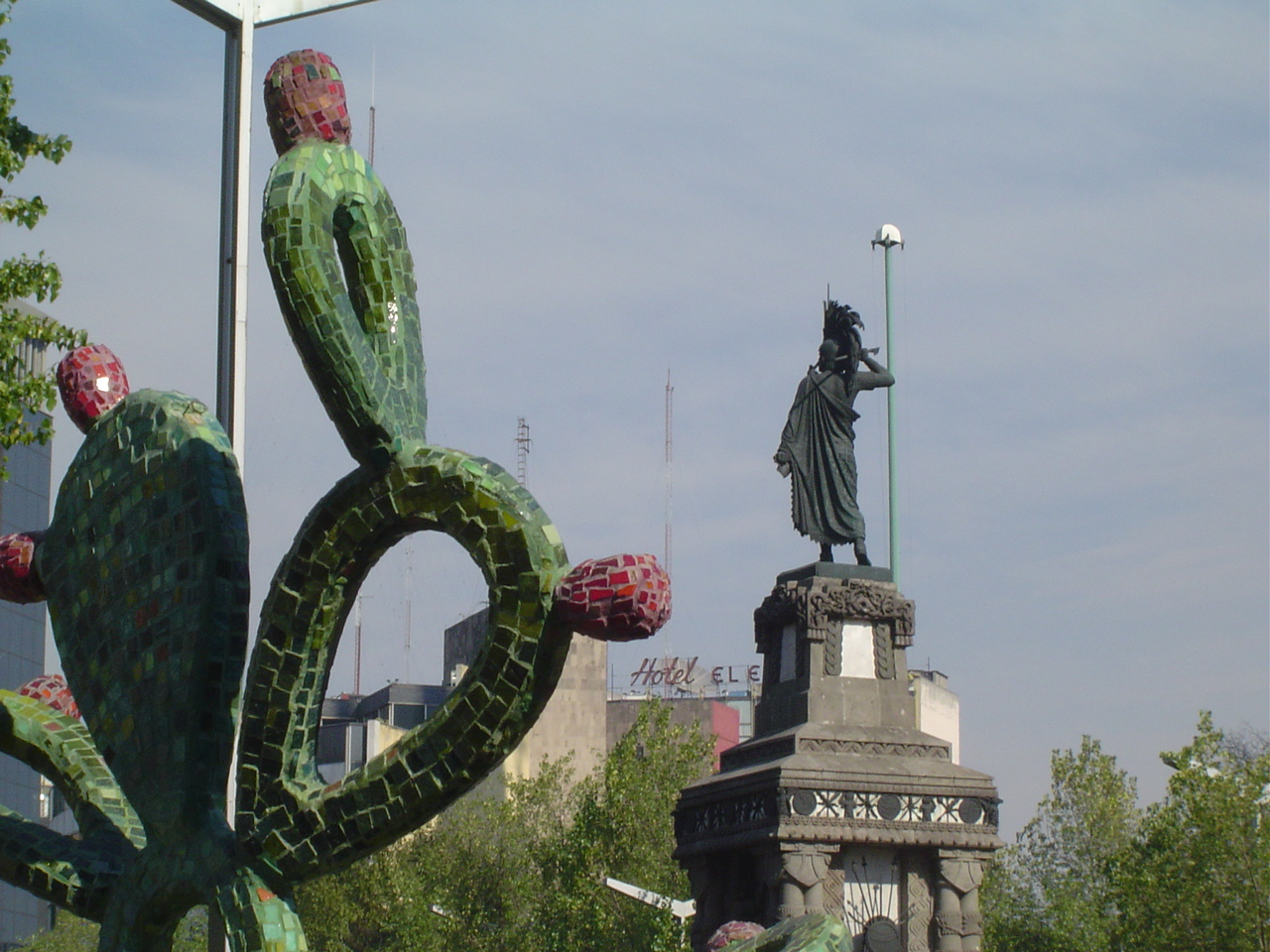

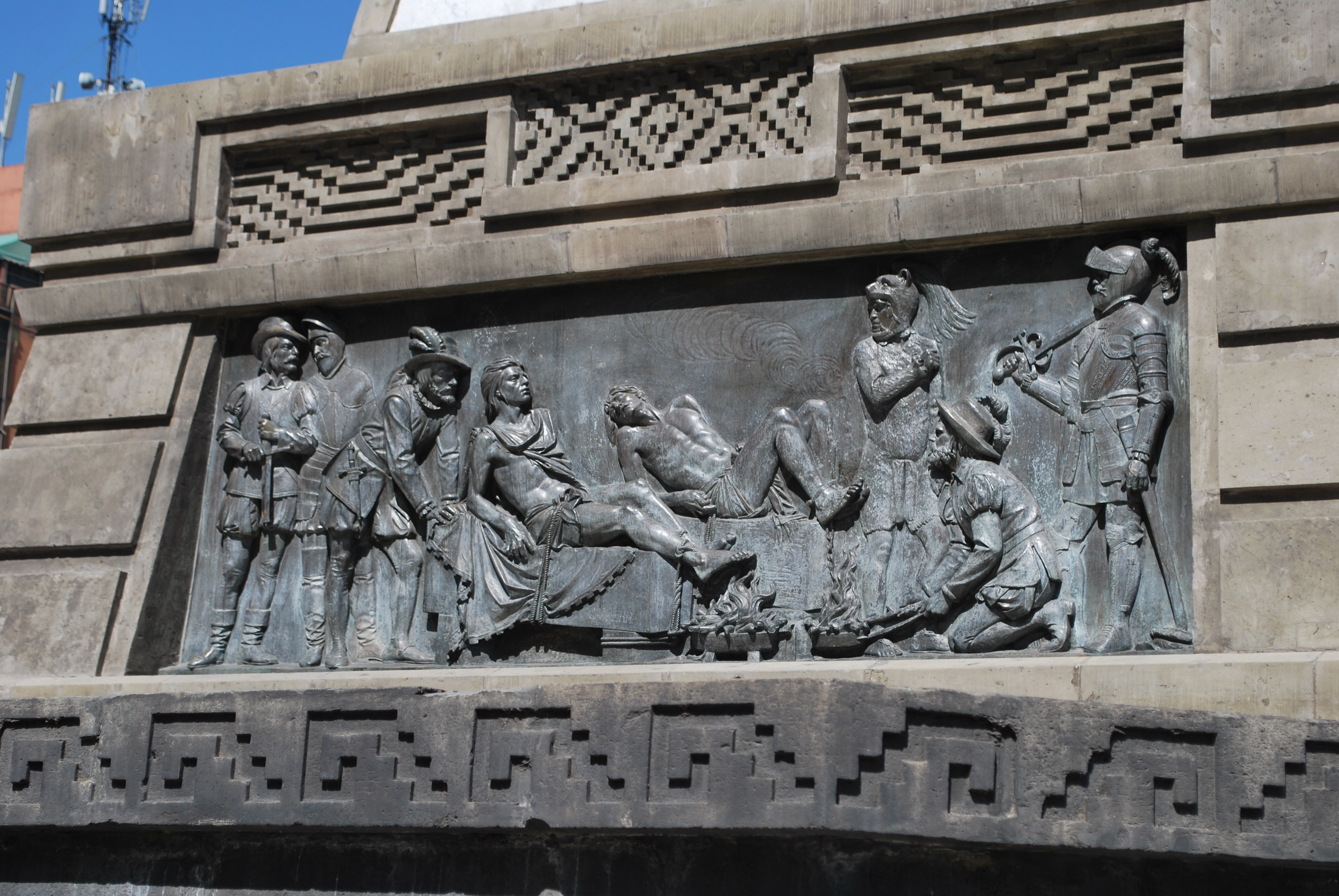
The torment Cuauhtémoc, de Gabriel Guerra

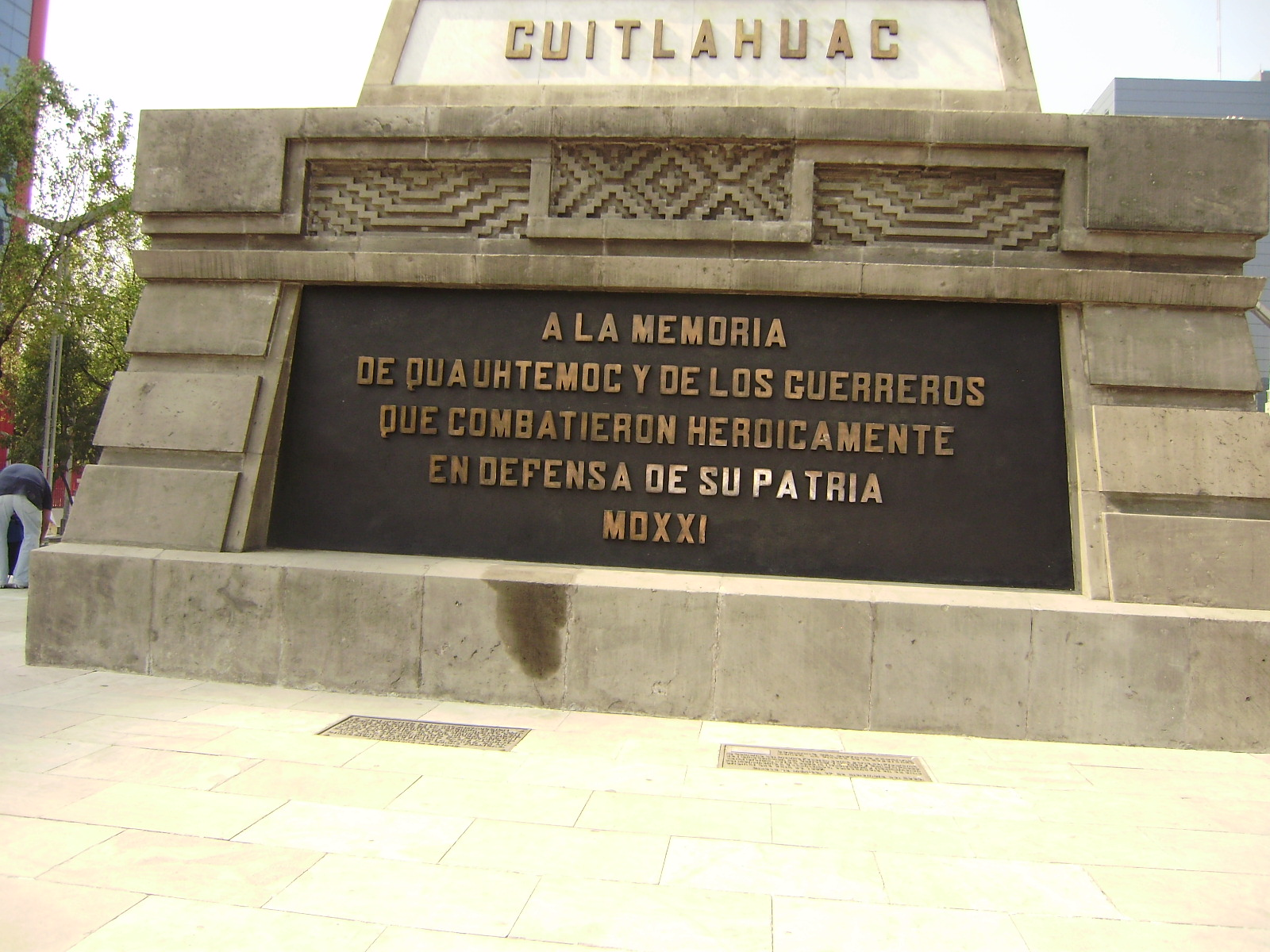

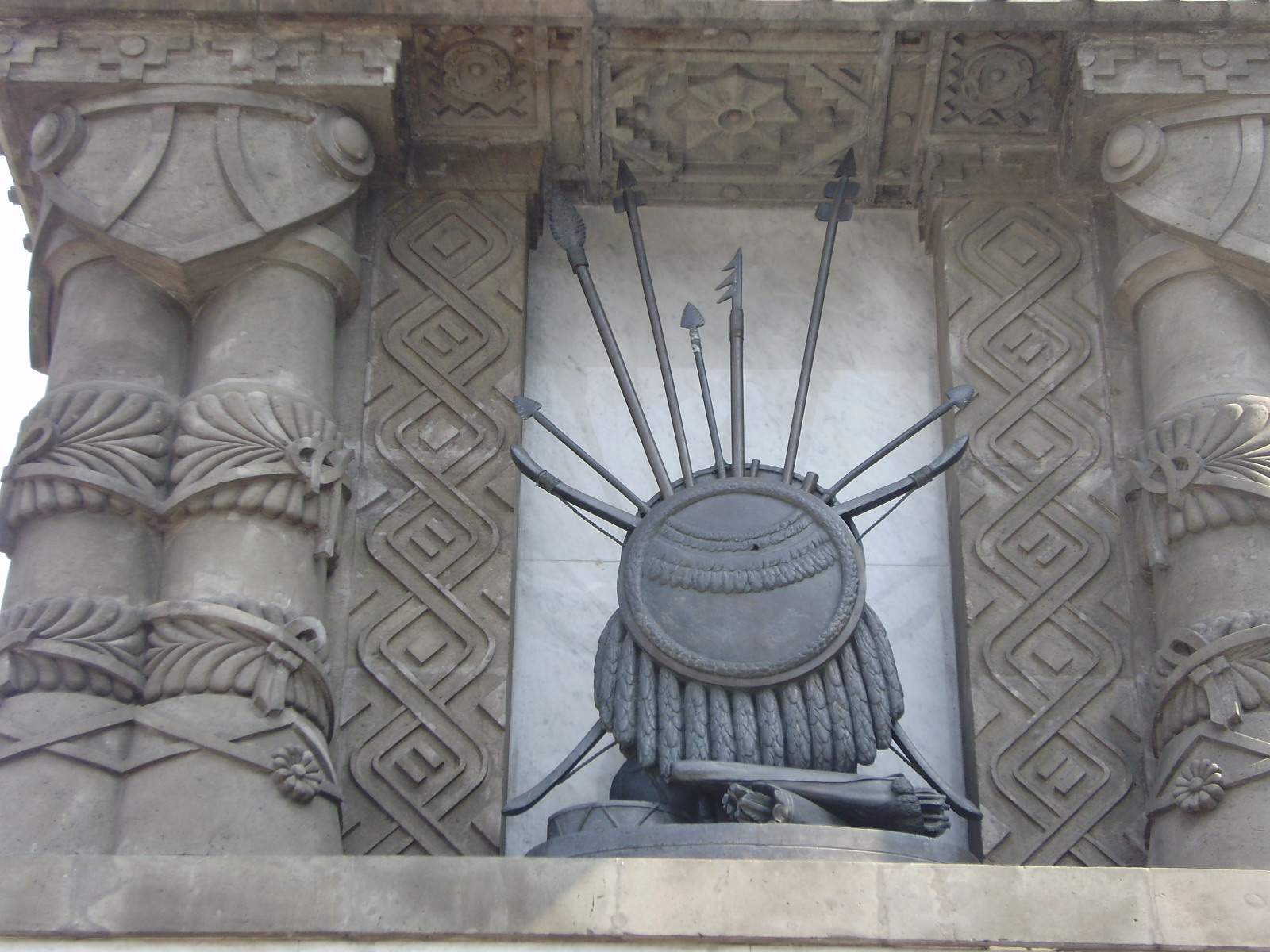

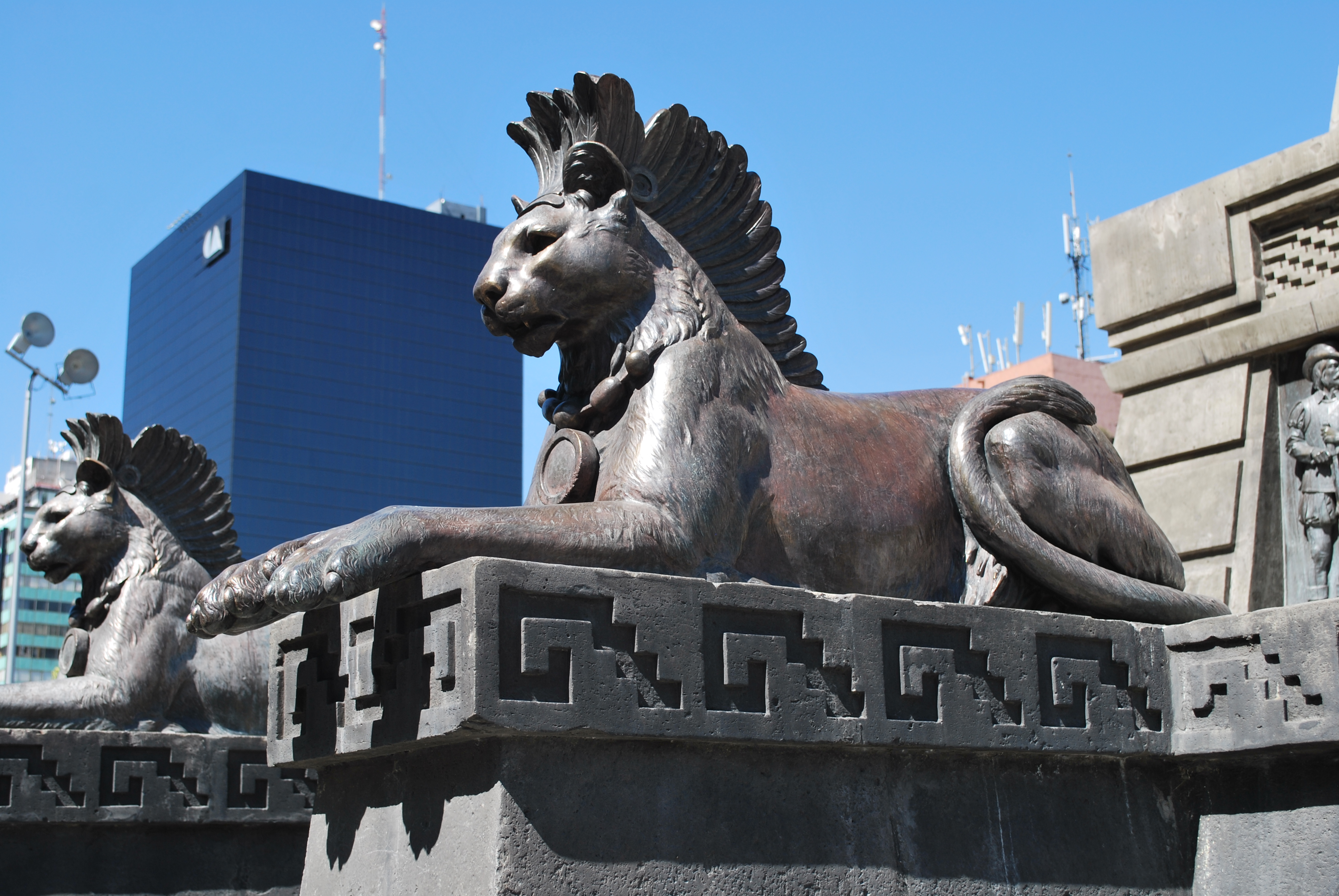

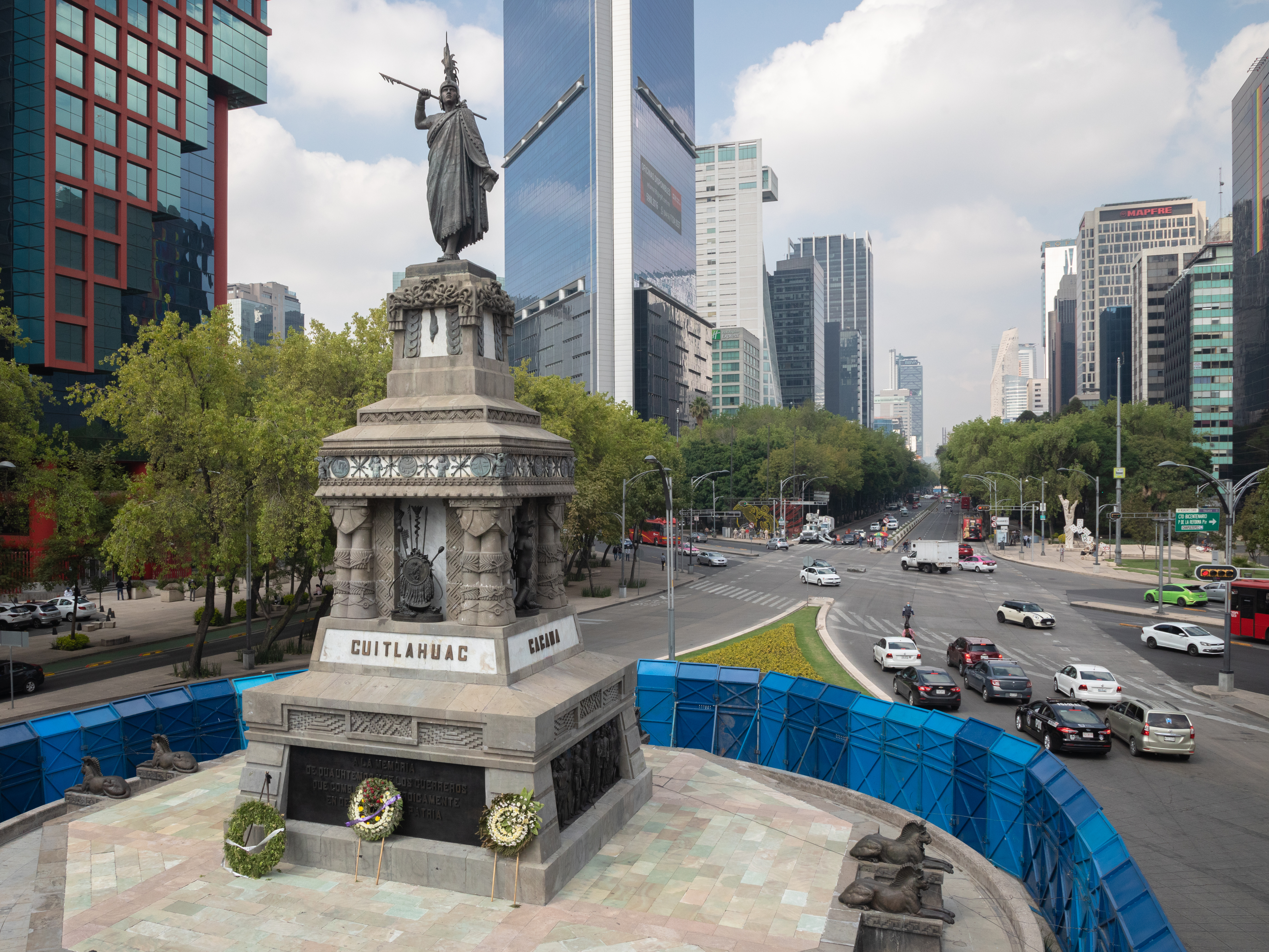

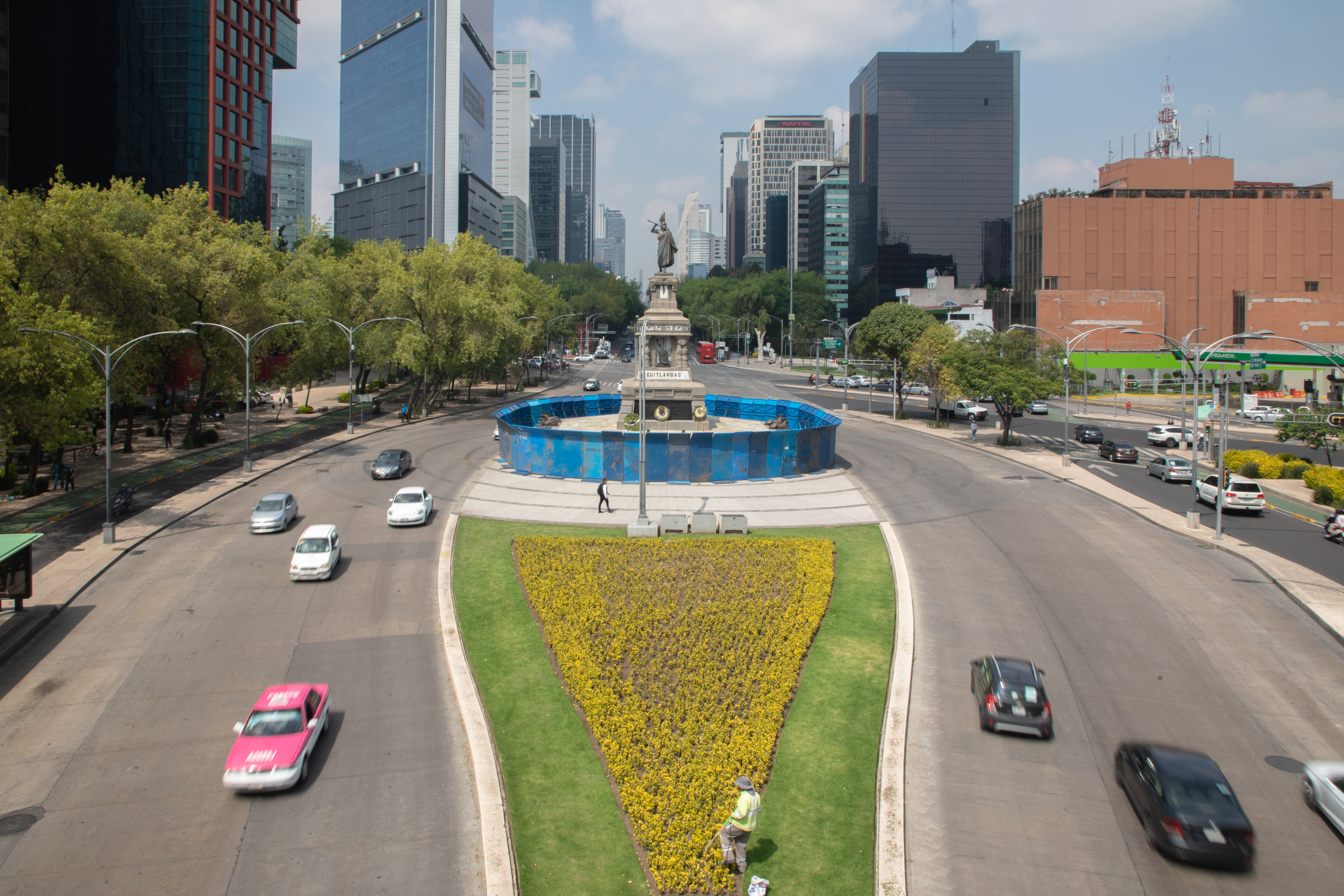

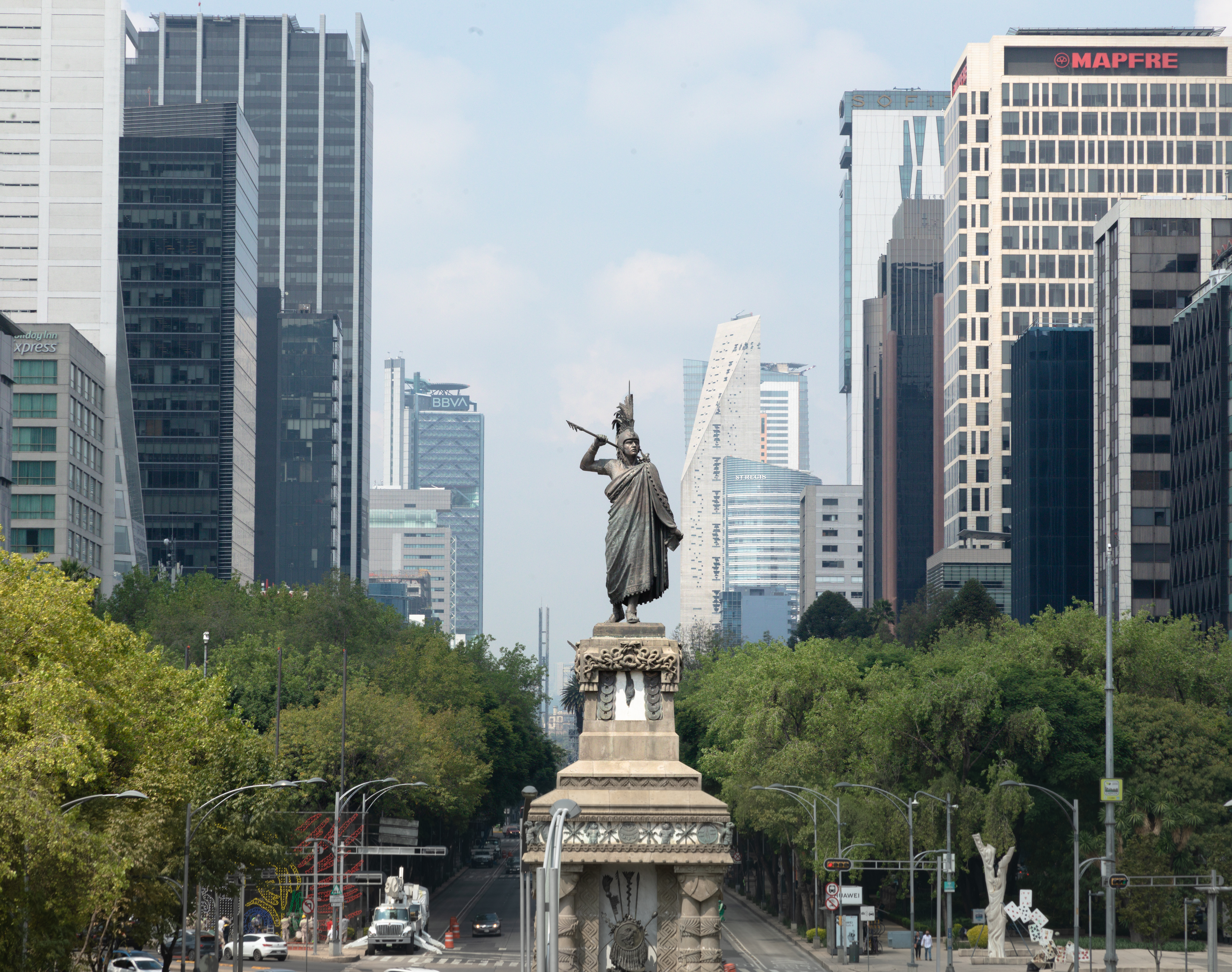

== See also ==
- Angel of Independence
- Monumento a la Revolución
