= Gabriel Guerra =

Gabriel Guerra may refer to:

- Gabriel Guerra (sculptor) (1847–1893), Mexican sculptor
- Gabriel Guerra-Mondragón (born 1942), American ambassador
- Gabriel Guerra (footballer) (born 1993), Argentine footballer
- DJ Scheme (Gabriel Guerra; born 1997), American record producer
