= Montezuma's Daughter =

1892 novel by H. Rider Haggard

- First edition (publ. Longman & Co.)
- Author: H. Rider Haggard
- Language: English
- Publication date: 1893

Montezuma's Daughter, first published in 1893, is a novel by the Victorian adventure writer H. Rider Haggard.

While Haggard was in Mexico in 1891, doing research for the book, he received news that his only son had died, which dealt him a lasting blow and badly affected his health. Haggard later wrote that Montezuma's Daughter was the last of his best work "for the rest was repetition so far as fiction was concerned". Like many Victorian adventure novels, this one sometimes treats the natives as naïve and barbaric, but this is a flaw Haggard explicitly points out in his main character.

== Plot ==
Narrated in the first person by Thomas Wingfield, an Englishman whose adventures include having his mother murdered by his Spanish cousin Juan de Garcia, a brush with the Spanish Inquisition, shipwreck, and slavery. Eventually, Thomas unwillingly joins a Spanish expedition to New Spain, and the novel tells a fictionalized story of the first interactions between the natives and European explorers. This includes a number of misunderstandings, prejudice on the part of the Spaniards, and ultimately open war.

During the course of the story, Thomas meets and marries Otomie, the daughter of the native king and his Otomi wife, from whom the novel takes its title, and settles into life in Mexico. The war destroys his native family, and after his nemesis, Otomie, and his five children perish, Wingfield returns to England and weds Lily Bozard, the English betrothed of his youth.

== Characters ==
=== English ===
- Thomas Wingfield is the novel's half-English, half-Spanish protagonist, who embarks on a dangerous journey to find and punish his mother's murderer.
- Geoffrey Wingfield is Thomas' older brother and his rival for Lily Bozard's hand in marriage.
- Mary Wingfield - Thomas's younger sister, later wife of Wilfrid Bozard.
- Lily Bozard is the daughter of an English squire and the lover and fiancée of Thomas Wingfield.
- Wilfrid Bozard is Lily Bozard's older brother and Mary's husband.

=== Spaniards ===
- Luisa de Garcia was a Spanish noblewoman who fled to England with her lover and was the mother of Thomas, Geoffrey and Mary.
- Andrés de Fonseca is the keeper of the secrets of the city of Seville, providing various services to people in difficulty.
- Juan de Garcia is Luisa's cousin and ex-fiancé.
- Isabella de Siguenza is a nun who was seduced and abandoned by Juan de Garcia.
- Hernán Cortés is a Spanish conquistador, conqueror of Mexico.
- Bernal Diaz is a Spanish conquistador who was a member of Hernan Cortez's expedition.

=== Indians ===
- Montezuma II is the emperor of the Aztecs.
- Otomi is the daughter of the Aztec Emperor Montezuma and a woman of the Otomi people, the sister of Cuauhtemoc, and the wife of Thomas Wingfield.
- Cuauhtémoc is the nephew of Montezuma, and after the death of his uncle, the last emperor of the Aztecs.
- Cuitlahuac is Montezuma's brother and briefly ruled Anahuac.
- Marina is Cortez's mistress.

== Reception ==
Gary Westfahl described Montezuma's Daughter and Cleopatra as "atmospheric historical romances".
