= Gabriel Guerra (sculptor) =

Mexican sculptor (1847–1893)

Gabriel Guerra (1847 – 3 November 1893) was a Mexican sculptor. He was born in Unión de San Antonio, Jalisco and trained at Escuela Nacional de Bellas Artes (National School of Fine Arts) in Mexico City where he studied with Miguel Noreña.

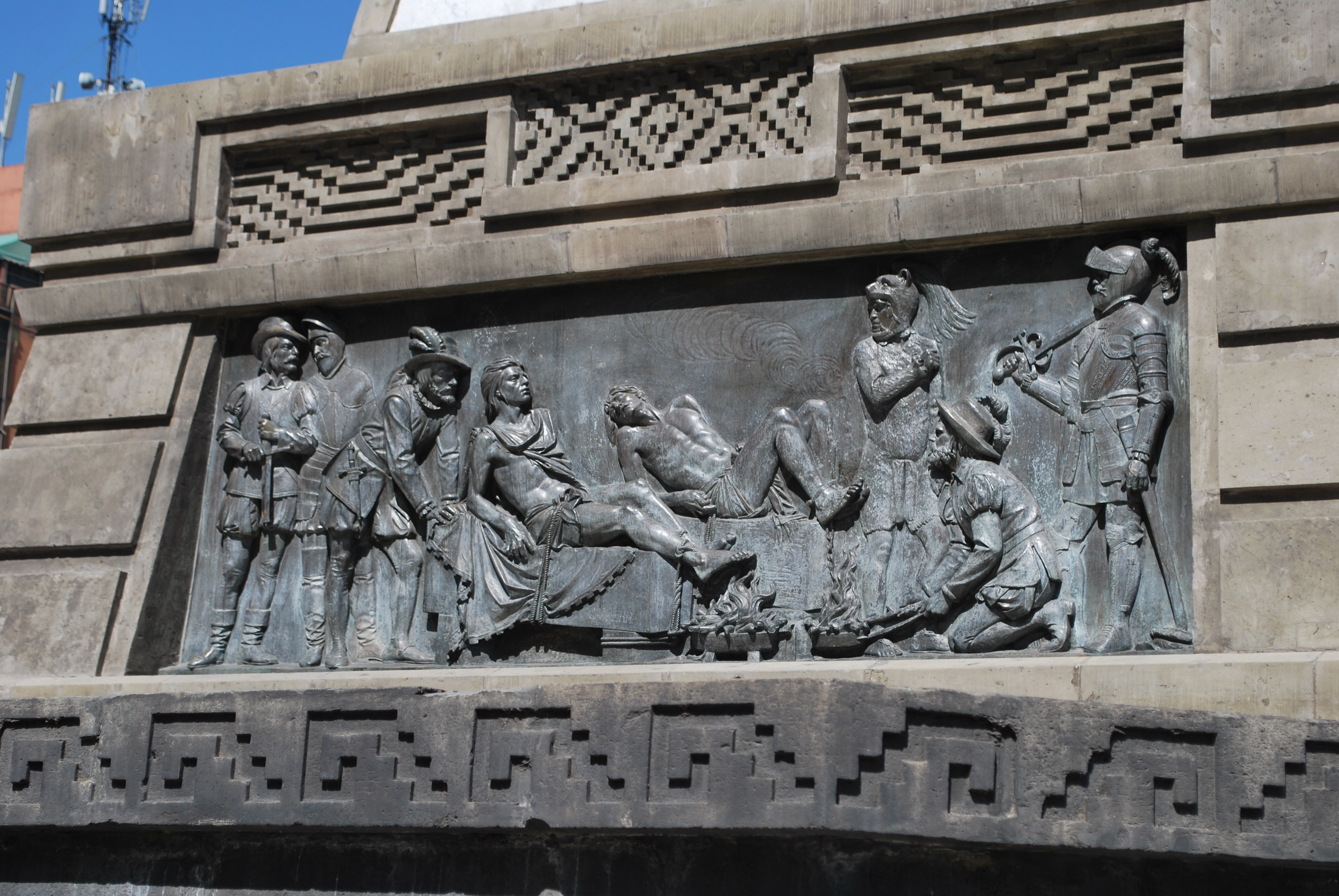
Cuauhtemoc's torture on a monument to him on the Paseo de la Reforma

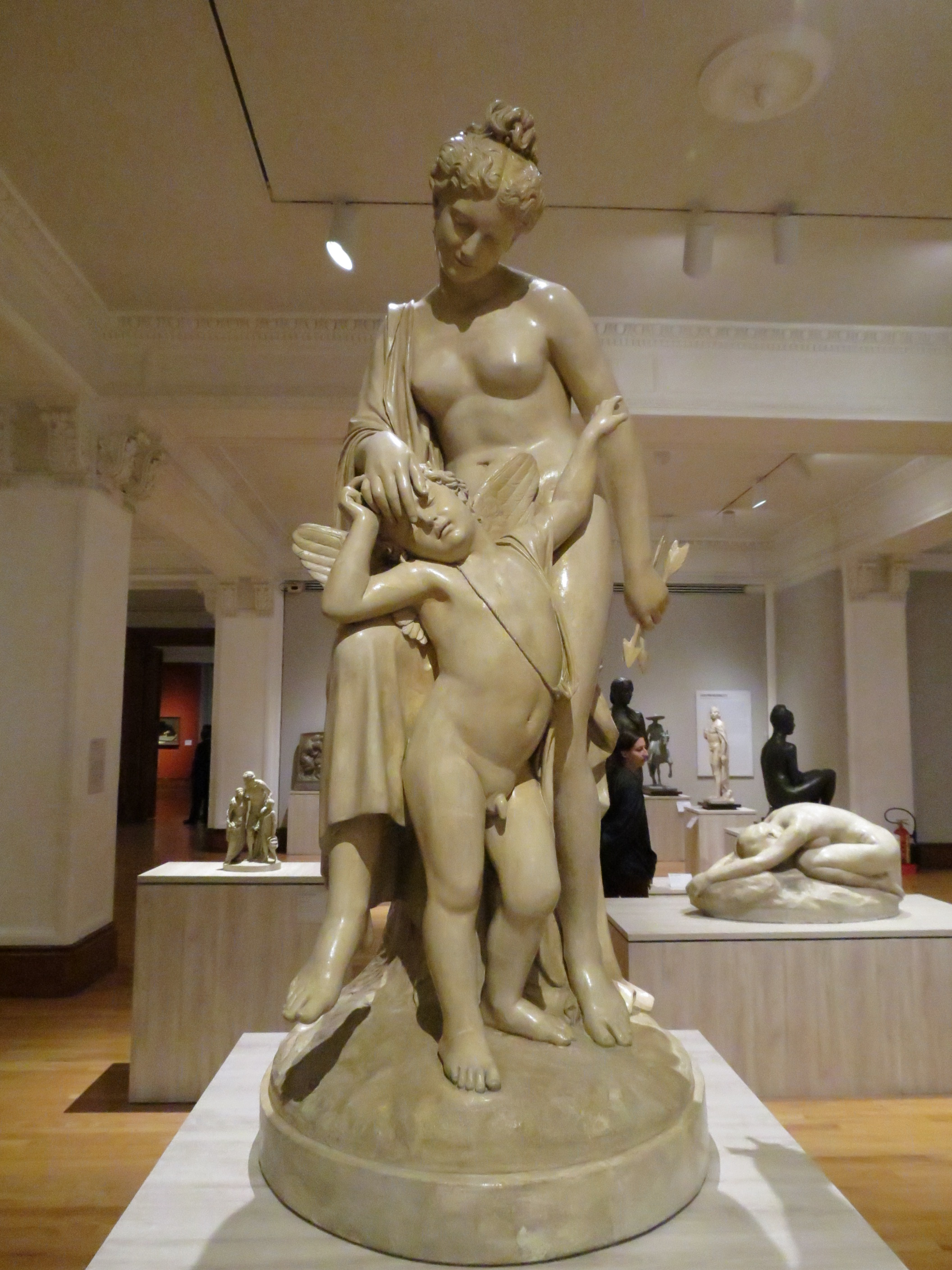
Venus end cupido

Significant monumental sculptures by Guerra include Torture of Cuauhtémoc (1886), which was one of a group of bronze reliefs by various artists cast for the Monument to Cuauhtémoc in Mexico City, and General Carlos Pacheco on commission for the state of Morelos. The former depicts Cuauhtémoc's encounter with Hernán Cortés, and was opened to the public on 21 August 1887 at a total cost of over 97,000 pesos and a total weight of over 11,000 kilograms of bronze. The latter was completed in plaster in 1892 and cast posthumously in bronze in 1894.

Guerra's work in secular subjects marked a departure from the Biblical themes that had dominated Mexican sculpture of the mid-nineteenth century. Guerra's interest in portraying Mexican historic subjects from the perspective of the country's indigenous inhabitants marked him as part of a politically significant liberal artistic movement that was active late in the century. Guerra died at the age of 46.
