= Cuauhtémoc =

Eleventh and final Tlatoani of Tenochtitlan

- Huey Tlatoani of the Mexica
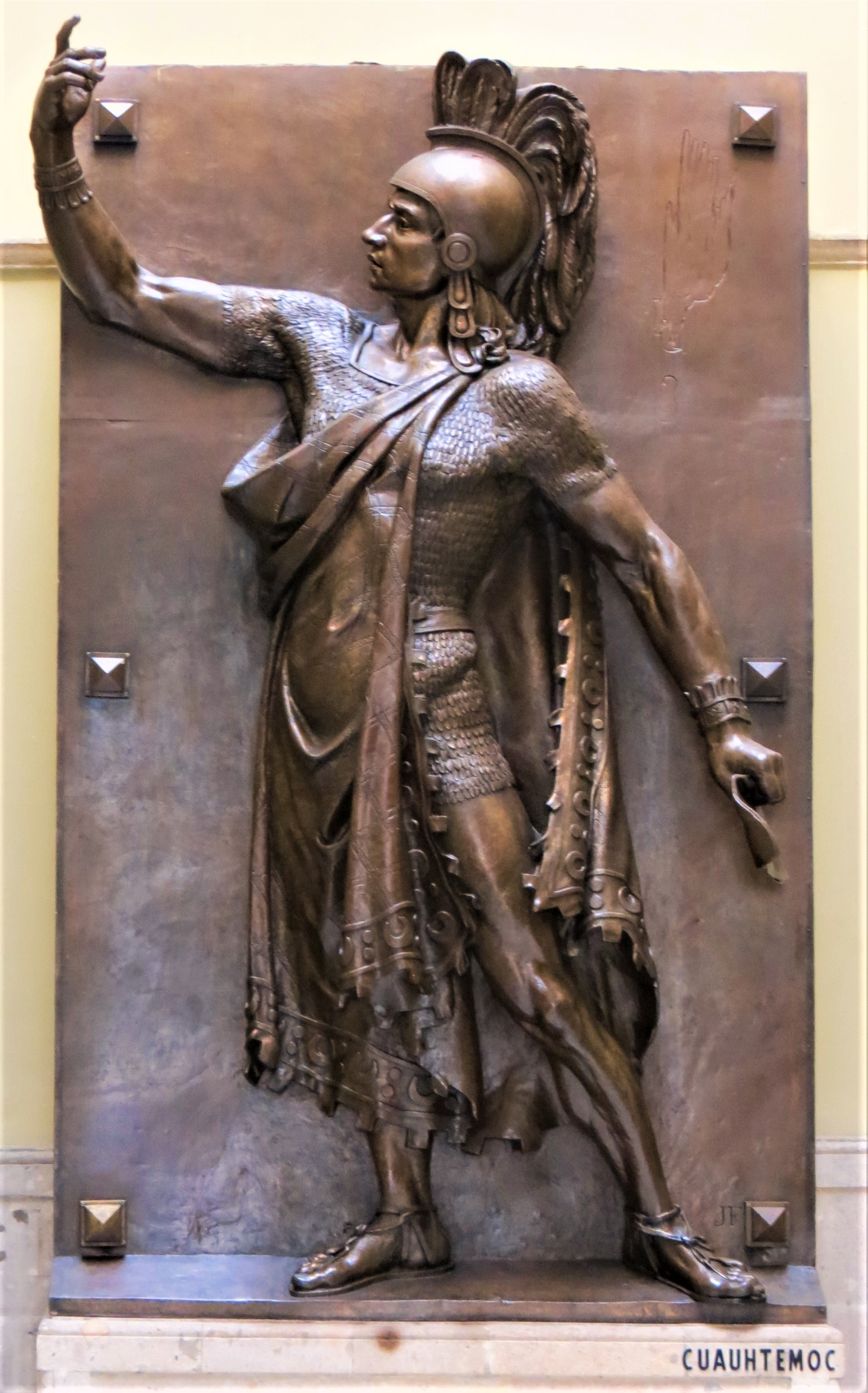
- Relief of Cuauhtémoc in the lobby of the Museum of the Mexican Army in Mexico City, by Jesús F. Contreras.

Huey Tlatoani
- Reign: 25 January 1521 – 28 February 1525
- Coronation: 25 January 1521
- Predecessor: Cuitlahuac
- Successor: Tlacotzin (appointed by the Spanish)
- Born: 14 July 1496; Tenochtitlan, Aztec Empire
- Died: 28 February 1525 (aged 28); Acalan, New Spain (now Campeche, Mexico)
- Cause of death: Assassination by hanging
- Burial: Ixcateopan de Cuauhtémoc, Guerrero
- Father: Ahuitzotl
- Mother: Izelcoatzin
- Religion: Mexica religion

Cuauhtémoc (Nahuatl pronunciation: [kʷaːʍˈtemoːk], Spanish pronunciation: [kwawˈtemok]), also known as Cuauhtemotzín, Guatimozín, or Guatémoc, was the Aztec ruler (tlatoani) of Tenochtitlan from 1520 to 1521, and the last Aztec Emperor. The name Cuauhtemōc means "one who has descended like an eagle", commonly rendered in English as "Descending Eagle", evoking a raptor diving toward its prey.

Cuauhtémoc took power in 1520 as successor of Cuitláhuac and was a cousin of the late emperor Moctezuma II. His young wife, who was later known as Isabel Moctezuma, was one of Moctezuma's daughters. He ascended to the throne when he was around 25 years old, while Tenochtitlan was besieged by the Spanish and devastated by an epidemic of smallpox brought to the Americas by Spanish conquerors. After the killings in the Great Temple, there were probably few Aztec captains available to take the position.

== Early life ==
Cuauhtemoc's date of birth is unknown, as he does not enter the historical record until he became emperor. He was the eldest legitimate son of Emperor Ahuitzotl and may well have attended the last New Fire ceremony, marking the beginning of a new 52-year cycle in the Aztec calendar. According to several sources his mother, Tiyacapantzin, was a Tlatelolcan princess. Like the rest of Cuauhtemoc's early biography, that is inferred from knowledge of his age, and the likely events and life path of someone of his rank. Following education in the calmecac, the school for elite boys, and then his military service, he was named ruler of Tlatelolco, with the title cuauhtlatoani ("eagle ruler") in 1515. To have reached this position of rulership, Cuauhtemoc had to be a male of high birth and a warrior who had captured enemies for sacrifice. Cuauhtemoc married the Aztec princess who later became known as Isabel Moctezuma.

== Rule ==
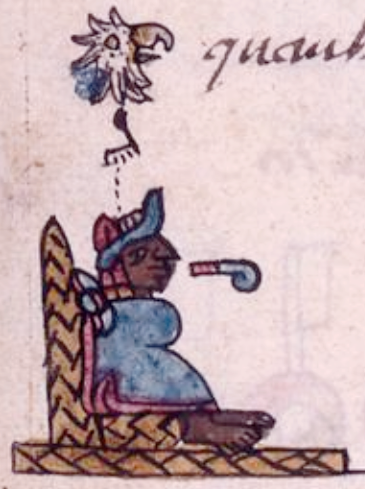
Cuauhtémoc depicted in the Aubin Codex, a 16th-century Aztec manuscript illustrating the last ruler of Tenochtitlan.

When Cuauhtemoc was elected tlatoani in 1520, Tenochtitlan had already been rocked by the invasion of the Spanish and their indigenous allies, the death of Moctezuma II, and the death of Moctezuma's brother Cuitlahuac, who succeeded him as ruler, but died of smallpox shortly afterwards. In keeping with traditional practice, the most able candidate among the high noblemen was chosen by vote of the highest noblemen, and Cuauhtemoc assumed the rulership. Although under Cuitlahuac Tenochtitlan began mounting a defense against the invaders, it was increasingly isolated militarily and largely faced the crisis alone, as the numbers of Spanish allies increased with the desertion of many polities previously under its control.

Cuauhtémoc oversaw the funeral of the previous emperor, Moctezumea. This funeral was done without any of the pomp of previous funerals, largely because Cuauhtémoc wanted Moctezuma's memory to be diminished. This attitude came from Cuauhtémoc's belief in the need for armed resistance to the Spanish invasion while Moctezuma had believed in negotiation and avoiding a war he believed the empire could not win. Denying him a proper funeral served as a way to diminish what Moctezuma stood for.

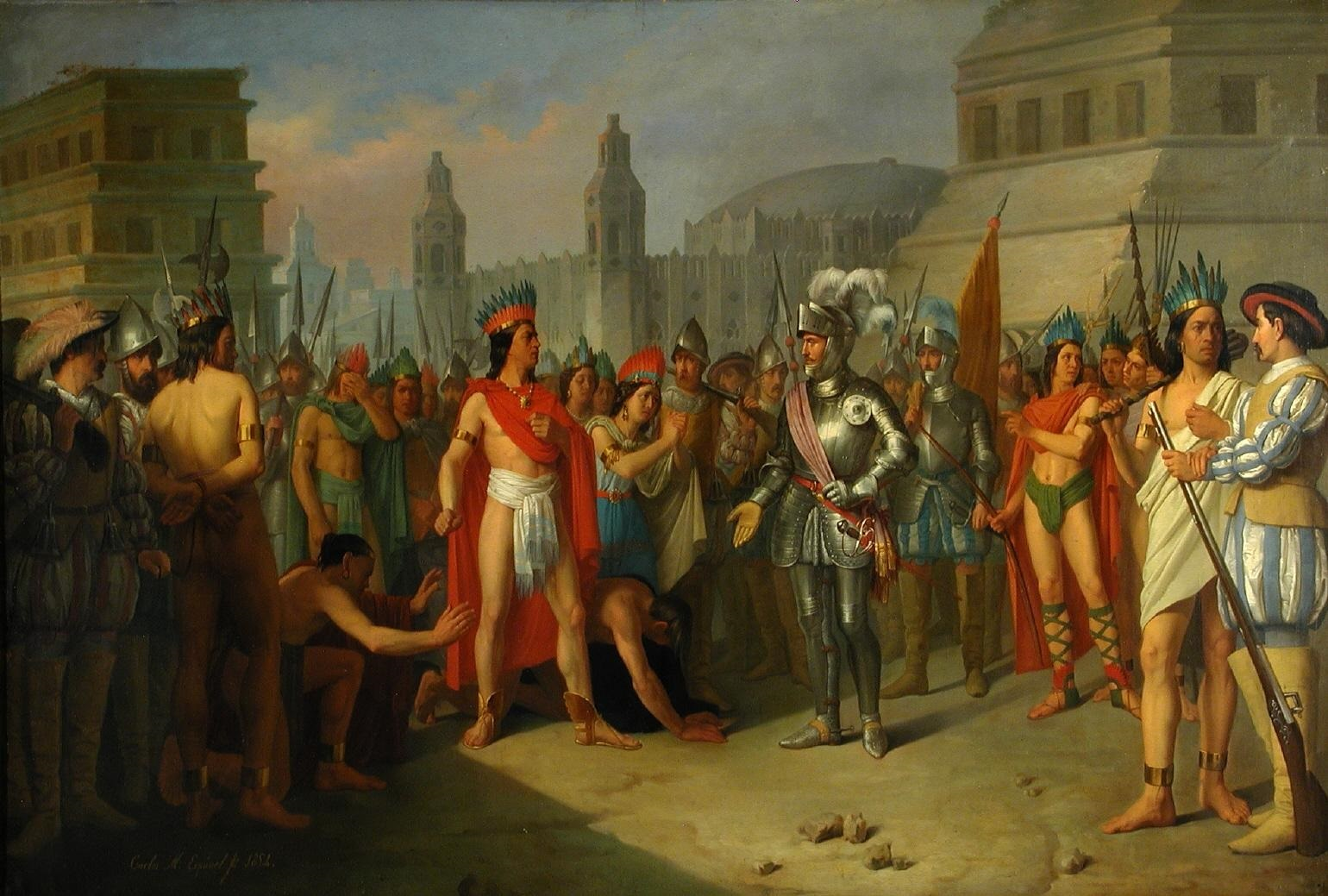
Prison of Guatimocín, last emperor of Mexico, painted by Carlos Esquivel y Rivas in 1854

Cuauhtémoc called for reinforcements from the countryside to aid the defense of Tenochtitlán, after eighty days of warfare against the Spanish. Of all the Nahuas, only Tlatelolcas remained loyal, and the surviving Tenochcas looked for refuge in Tlatelolco, where even women took part in the battle. Cuauhtémoc was captured on August 13, 1521, while fleeing Tenochtitlán by crossing Lake Texcoco with his wife, family, and friends.

He surrendered to Hernán Cortés along with the surviving pipiltin (nobles) and, according to Spanish sources, he asked Cortés to take his knife and "strike me dead immediately". According to the same Spanish accounts, Cortés refused the offer and treated his foe magnanimously. "You have defended your capital like a brave warrior," he declared. "A Spaniard knows how to respect valor, even in an enemy."

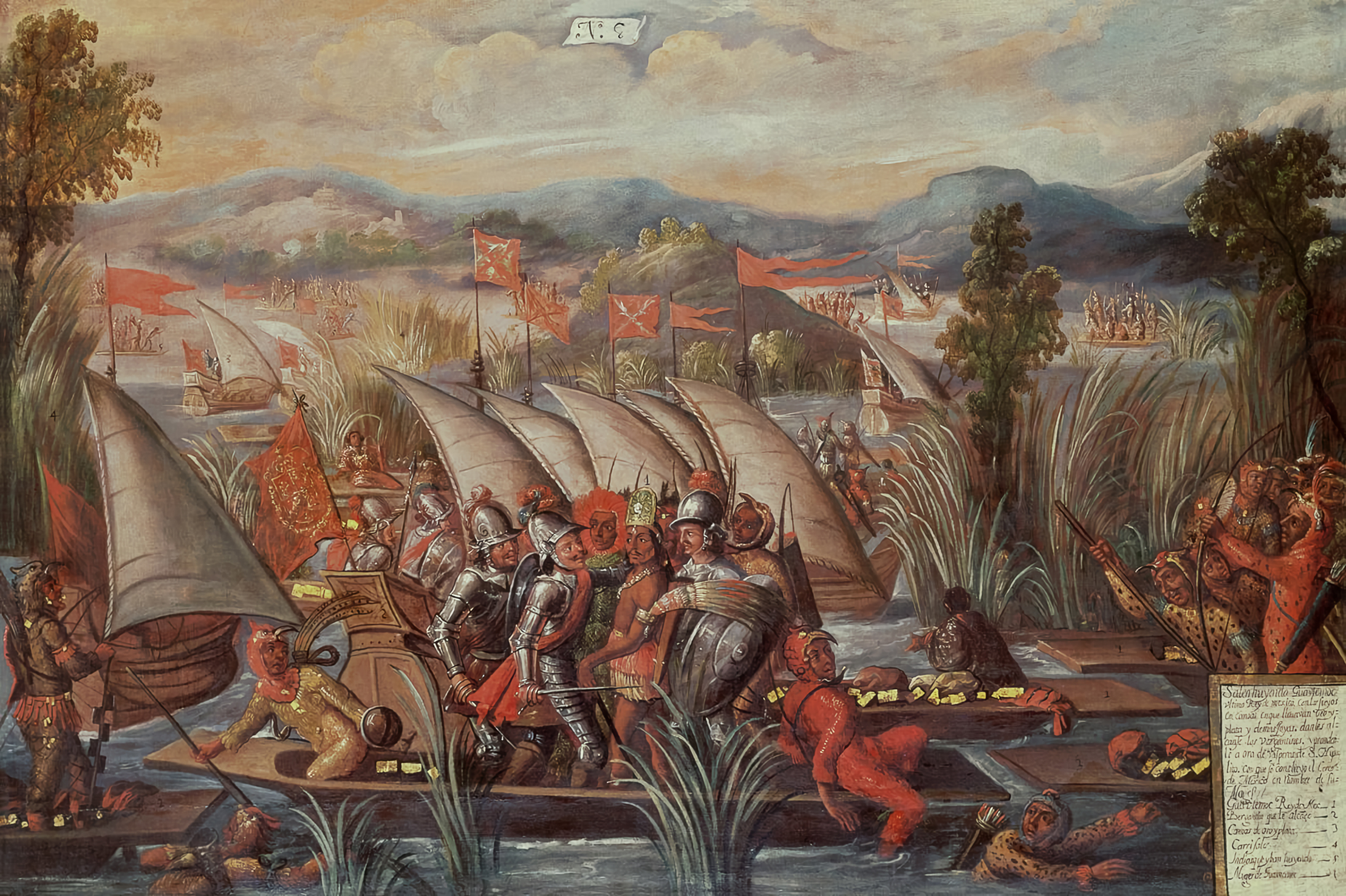
The capture of Cuauhtémoc, a 17th-century oil on canvas painting depicting the moment of Cuauhtémoc's capture during the Spanish conquest of Mexico.

At Cuauhtémoc's request, Cortés also allowed the defeated Mexica to depart the city unmolested. Subsequently, however, when the booty found did not measure up to the Spaniards' expectations, Cuauhtémoc was subjected to "torture by fire", whereby the soles of his bare feet were slowly broiled over red-hot coals, in an unsuccessful attempt to discover its whereabouts. On the statue to Cuitlahuac, on the Paseo de la Reforma in Mexico City, there is a bas relief showing the Spaniards' torture of the emperor. Eventually, some gold was recovered but far less than Cortés and his men expected.

Cuauhtémoc, now baptized as Fernando Cuauhtémotzín, continued to hold his position under the Spanish, keeping the title of tlatoani, but he was no longer the sovereign ruler. From his surrender until his death, Cuauhtémoc was mostly kept in guarded custody by the Spaniards.

== Execution ==
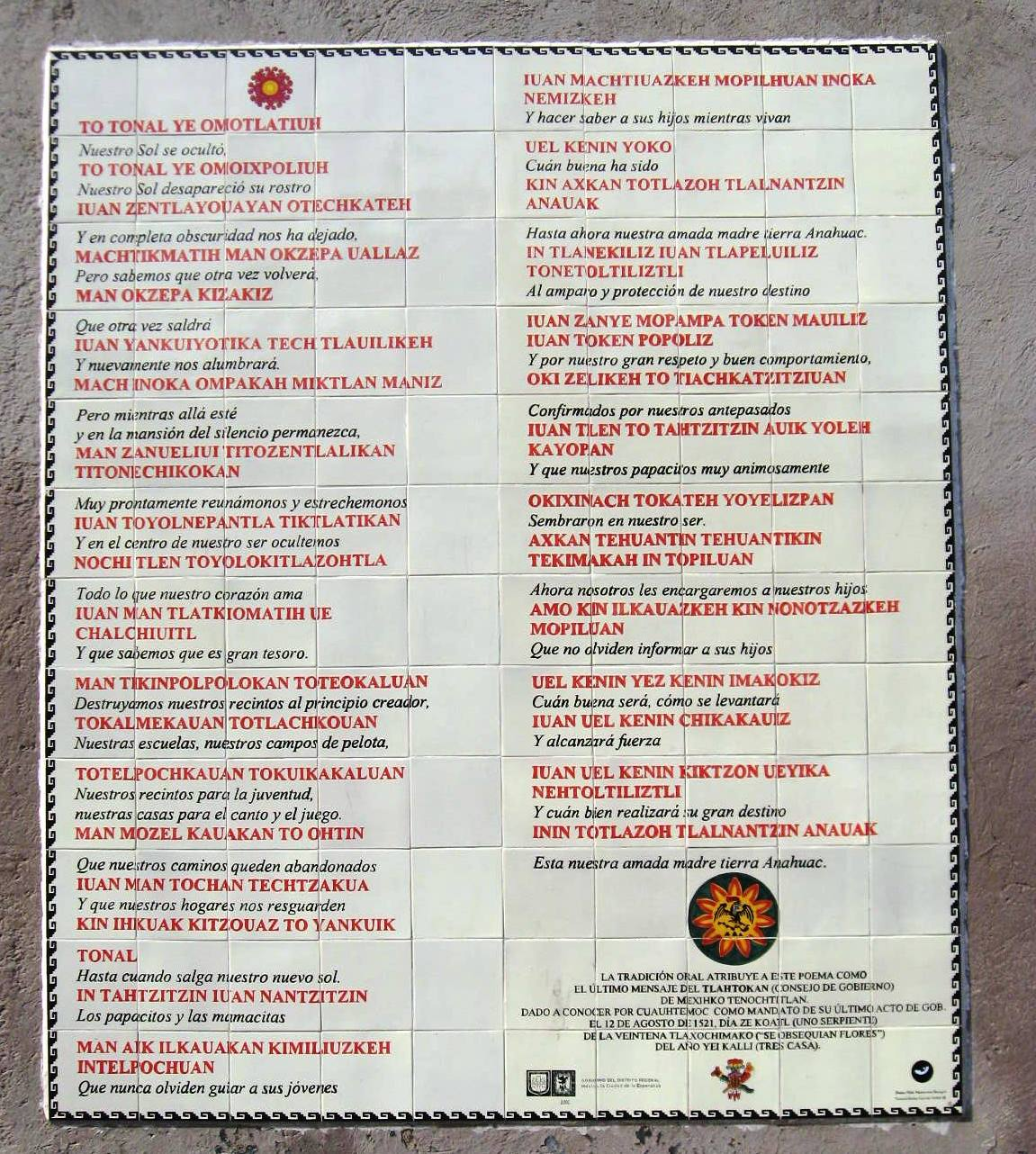
Mosaic of what is considered to be Cuauhtemoc's last address as tlatoani in Nahuatl and Spanish

In 1525, Cortés took Cuauhtémoc and several other indigenous nobles on his expedition to Honduras, as he feared that Cuauhtémoc could have led an insurrection in his absence. While the expedition was stopped in the Chontal Maya capital of Itzamkanac, known as Acalan in Nahuatl, Cortés had Cuauhtémoc executed for allegedly conspiring to kill him and the other Spaniards.

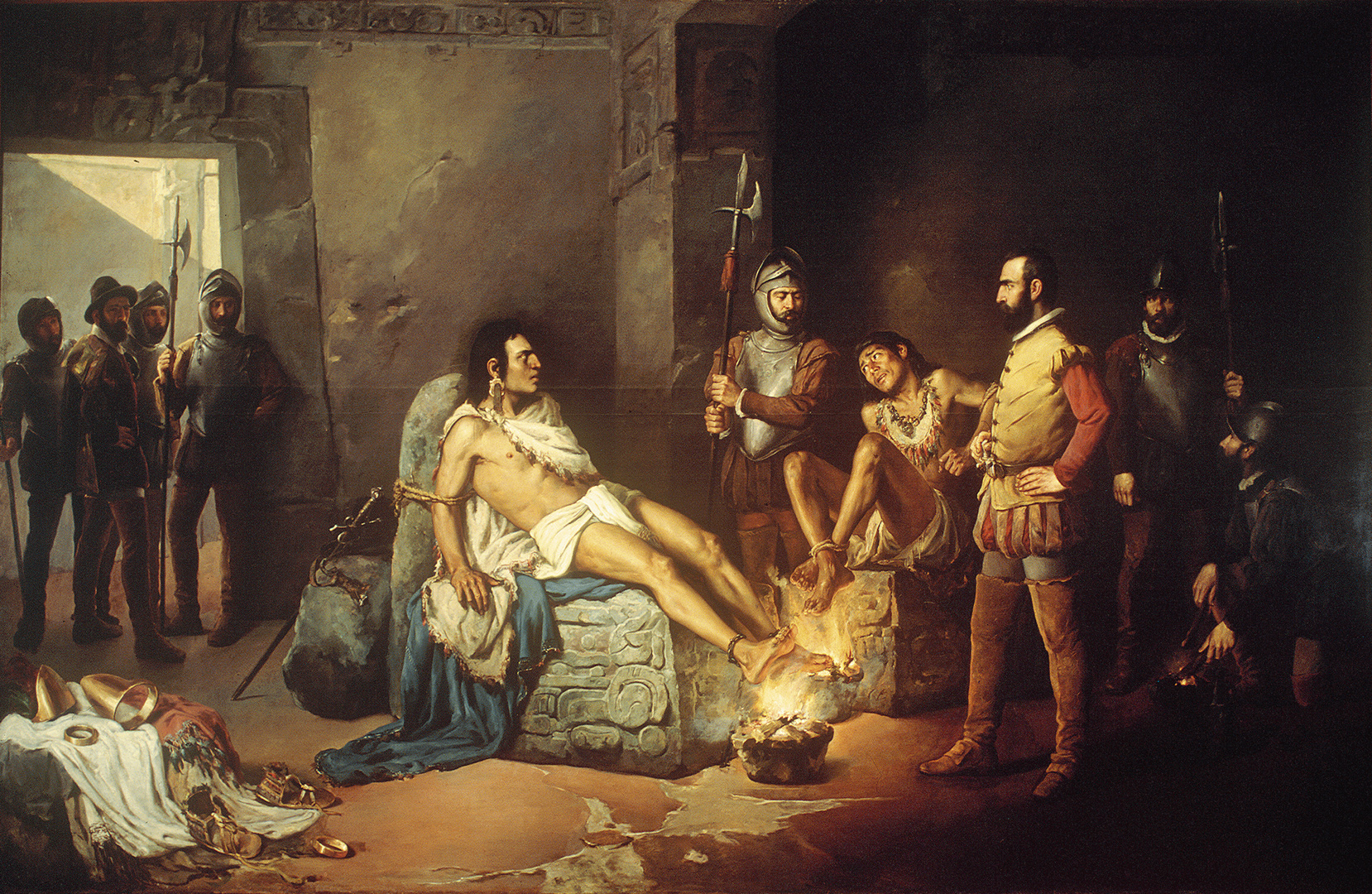
"The Martyrdom of Cuauhtémoc", a 19th-century painting by Leandro Izaguirre

There are a number of discrepancies in the various accounts of the event. According to Cortés himself, on 27 February 1525, he learned from a citizen of Tenochtitlan, Mexicalcingo, that Cuauhtémoc, Coanacoch (the ruler of Texcoco), and Tetlepanquetzal, the ruler of Tlacopan, were plotting his death. Cortés interrogated them until each confessed and then had Cuauhtémoc, Tetlepanquetzal, and another lord, Tlacatlec, hanged. Cortés wrote that the other lords would be too frightened to plot against him again, as they believed he had uncovered the plan through magic powers. Cortés's account was accepted by contemporary historian Francisco López de Gómara.

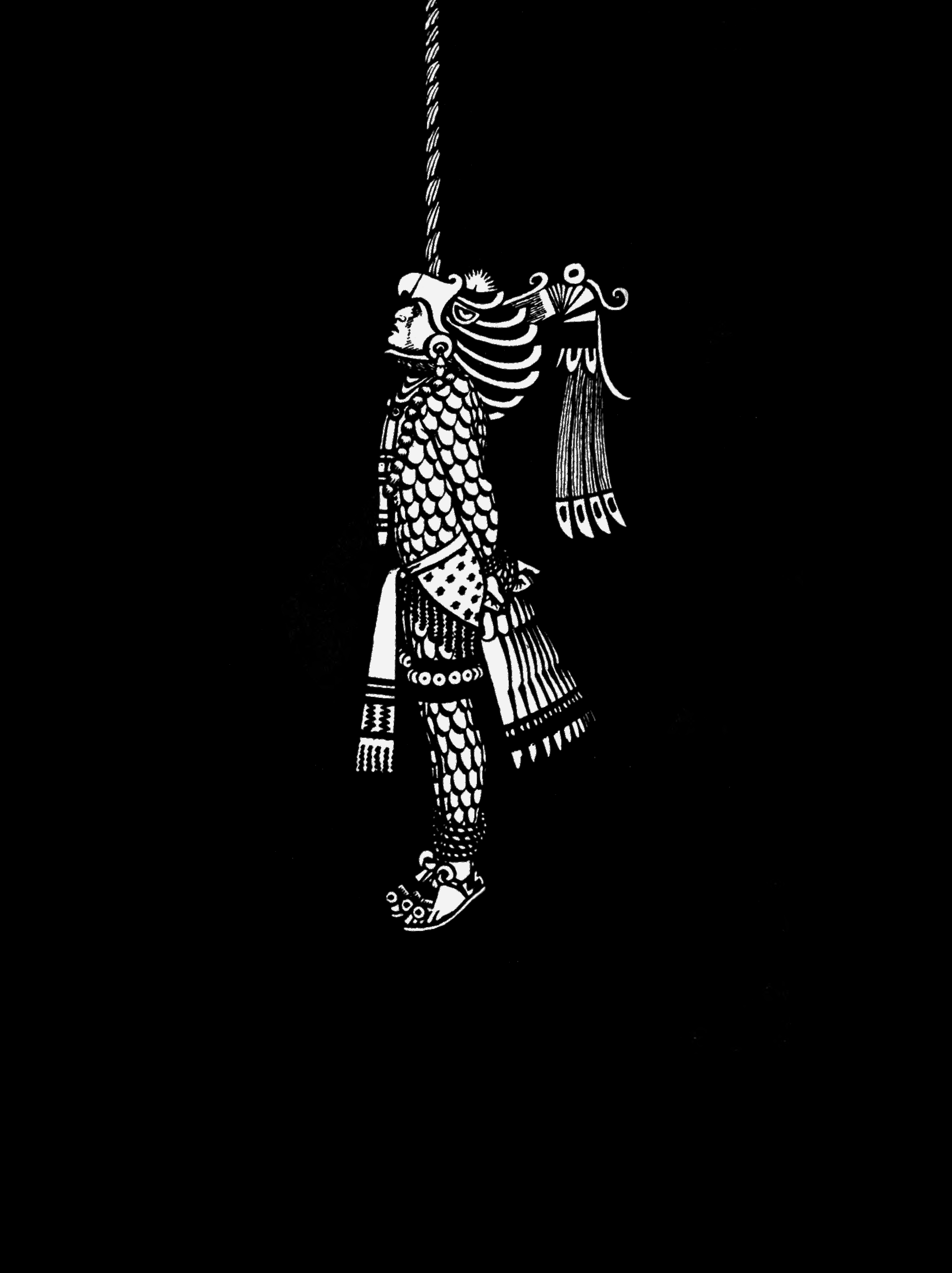
Illustration titled "Execution by hanging of Cuauhtémoc" from the book The Conquest of Mexico.

According to Bernal Díaz del Castillo, a conquistador serving under Cortés who recorded his experiences in his book The True History of the Conquest of New Spain, the supposed plot was revealed by two men, named Tapia and Juan Velásquez. Díaz portrays the executions as unjust and based on no evidence, and he admits to having liked Cuauhtémoc personally. He also records Cuauhtémoc giving the following speech to Cortés through his interpreter Malinche:

Oh Malinzin [i.e., Cortés]! Now I understand your false promises and the kind of death you have had in store for me. For you are killing me unjustly. May God demand justice from you, as it was taken from me when I entrusted myself to you in my city of Mexico!

Díaz wrote that afterwards, Cortés suffered from insomnia because of guilt and badly injured himself while he was wandering at night.

Fernando de Alva Cortés Ixtlilxóchitl, a castizo historian and descendant of Coanacoch, wrote an account of the executions in the 17th century partly based on Texcocan oral tradition. According to Ixtlilxóchitl, the three lords were joking cheerfully with one another because of a rumor that Cortés had decided to return the expedition to Mexico, when Cortés asked a spy to tell him what they were talking about. The spy reported honestly, but Cortés invented the plot himself. Cuauhtémoc, Coanacoch, and Tetlepanquetzal were hanged as well as eight others. However, Cortés cut down Coanacoch, the last to be hanged, after his brother began rallying his warriors. Coanacoch did not have long to enjoy his reprieve, as Ixtlilxóchitl wrote that he died a few days later.

Tlacotzin, Cuauhtémoc's cihuacoatl, was appointed his successor as tlatoani. He died the next year before he could return to Tenochtitlan.

== Bones ==
The modern-day town of Ixcateopan in the state of Guerrero is home to an ossuary purportedly containing Cuauhtémoc's remains. Archeologist Eulalia Guzmán, a "passionate indigenista", excavated the bones in 1949, which were discovered shortly after bones of Cortés, found in Mexico City, had been authenticated by the Instituto Nacional de Antropología e Historia (INAH). Initially, Mexican scholars congratulated Guzmán, but after a similar examination by scholars at INAH, their authenticity as Cuauhtemoc's was rejected, as the bones in the ossuary belonged to several different persons, several of them seemingly women. The finding caused a public uproar. A panel assembled by Guzmán gave support to the initial contention. The Secretariat of Public Education (SEP) had another panel examine the bones, which gave support to INAH's original finding, but did not report on the finding publicly. A scholarly study of the controversy was published in 2011 and argued that the available data suggests that the grave is an elaborate hoax prepared by a local of Ixcateopan as a way of generating publicity, and that subsequently supported by Mexican nationalists such as Guzman who wished to use the find for political purposes.

== Legacy ==
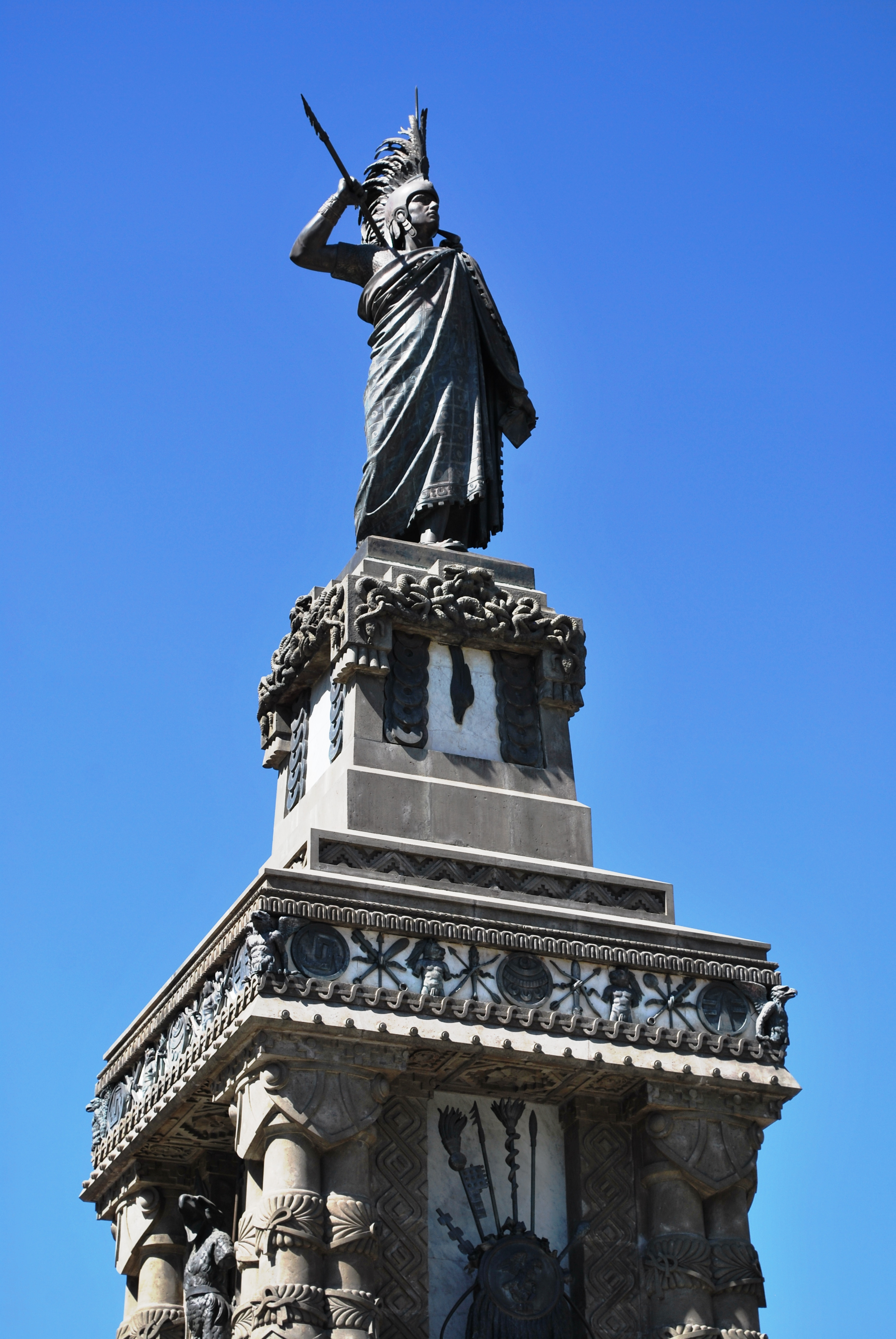
Monument to Cuauhtémoc in Mexico City.

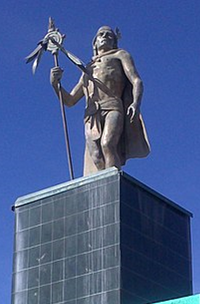
In the city of Cuauhtémoc, Chihuahua.

Monuments to Cuauhtémoc

Cuauhtemoc is the embodiment of indigenist nationalism in Mexico, being the only Aztec emperor who survived the conquest by the Spanish Empire (and their native allies). He is honored by a monument on the Paseo de la Reforma, his face has appeared on Mexican coins, banknotes, and he is celebrated in paintings, music, and popular culture.

Many places in Mexico are named in honour of Cuauhtémoc. These include Ciudad Cuauhtémoc in Chihuahua and the Cuauhtémoc borough of Mexico City. Smaller towns include Ciudad Cuauhtémoc, Veracruz and Ciudad Cuauhtémoc, Chiapas.

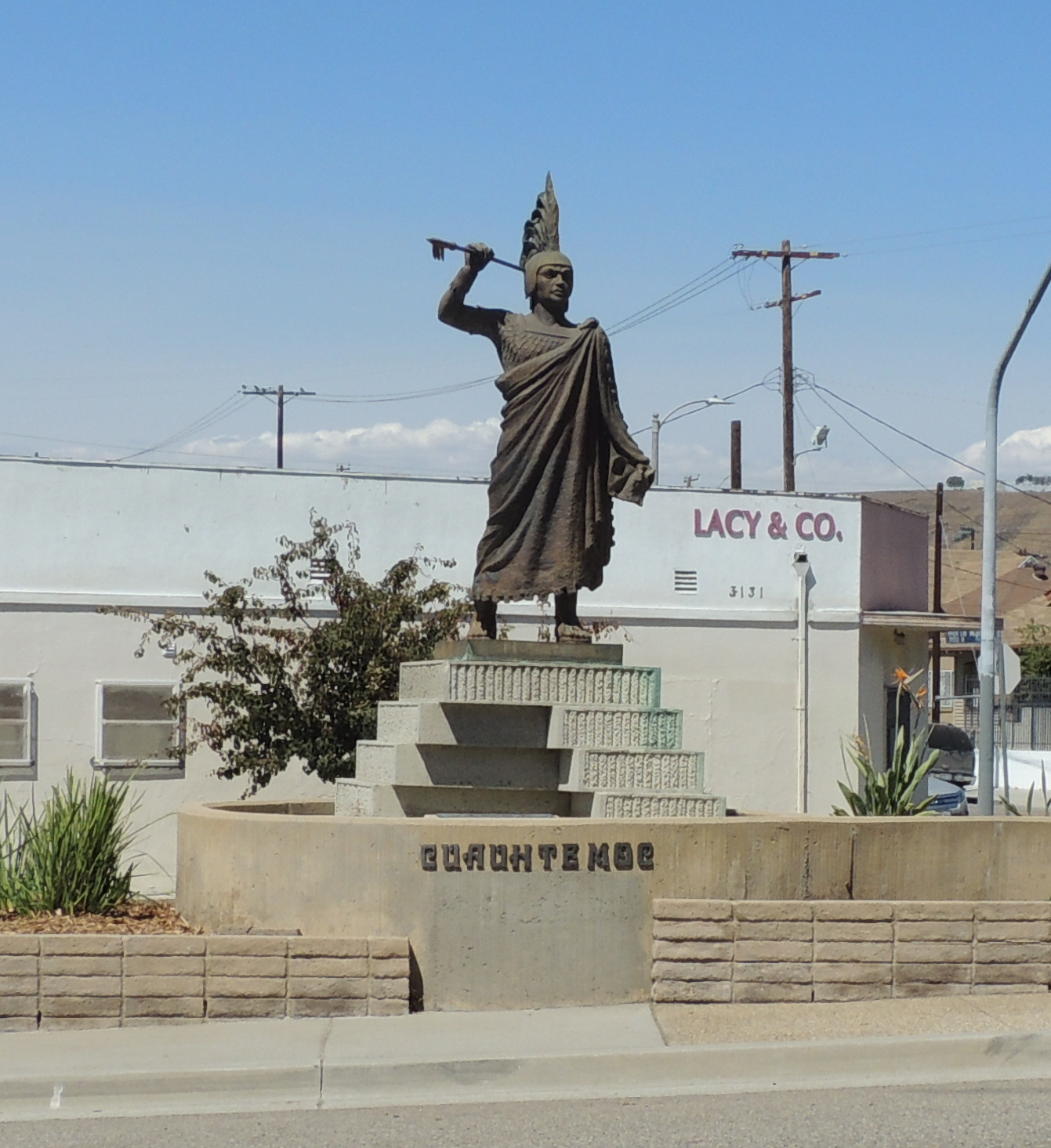
Statue of Cuauhtémoc in Los Angeles, California.

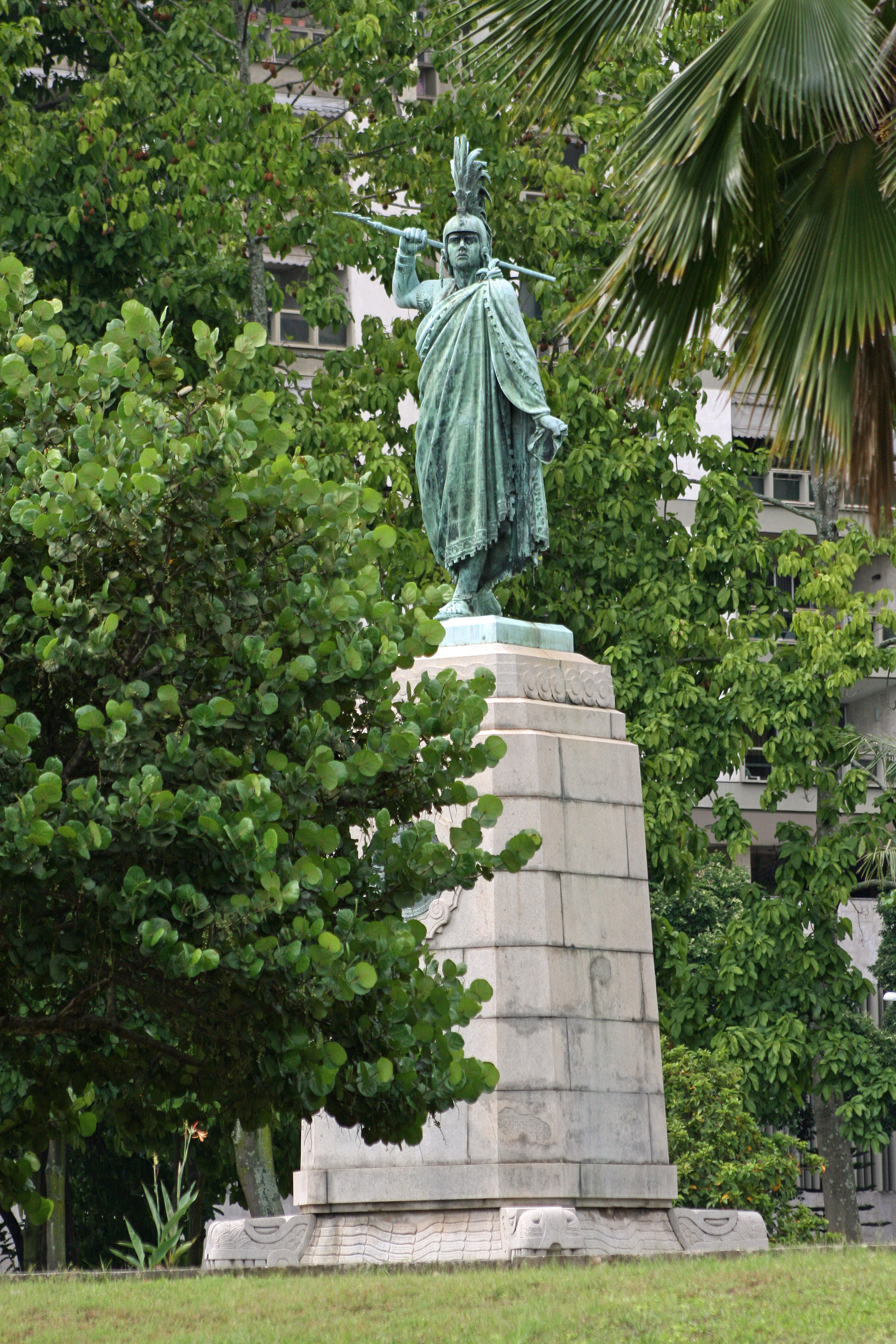
Monument to Cuauhtémoc at Praça Cuauhtémoc (Cuauhtémoc Square) in Rio de Janeiro, Brazil. Dedicated in 1922, the monument was a gift from the Mexican government to Brazil in celebration of the 100th anniversary of the Brazilian independence.

The Cuauhtémoc is a vessel of the Mexican Navy that serves as a cultural ambassador with frequent visits to world ports. There is a Cuauhtémoc station on Line 1 of the Mexico City metro as well as one for Moctezuma. There is also a metro station in Monterrey named after him.

Cuauhtémoc is also one of the few non-Spanish given names for Mexican boys that is perennially popular. Individuals with this name include the politician Cuauhtémoc Cárdenas and footballer Cuauhtémoc Blanco.

In the 1996 Rage Against the Machine single People of the Sun, lyricist Zack De La Rocha rhymes "Tha fifth sun sets get back reclaim. Tha spirit of Cuahtemoc alive and untamed."

Cuauhtémoc, in the name Guatemoc, is portrayed sympathetically in the adventure novel Montezuma's Daughter (1893), by H. Rider Haggard. First appearing in Chapter XIV, he becomes friends with the protagonist after they save each other's lives. His coronation, torture, and death are described in the novel.

== Honors ==
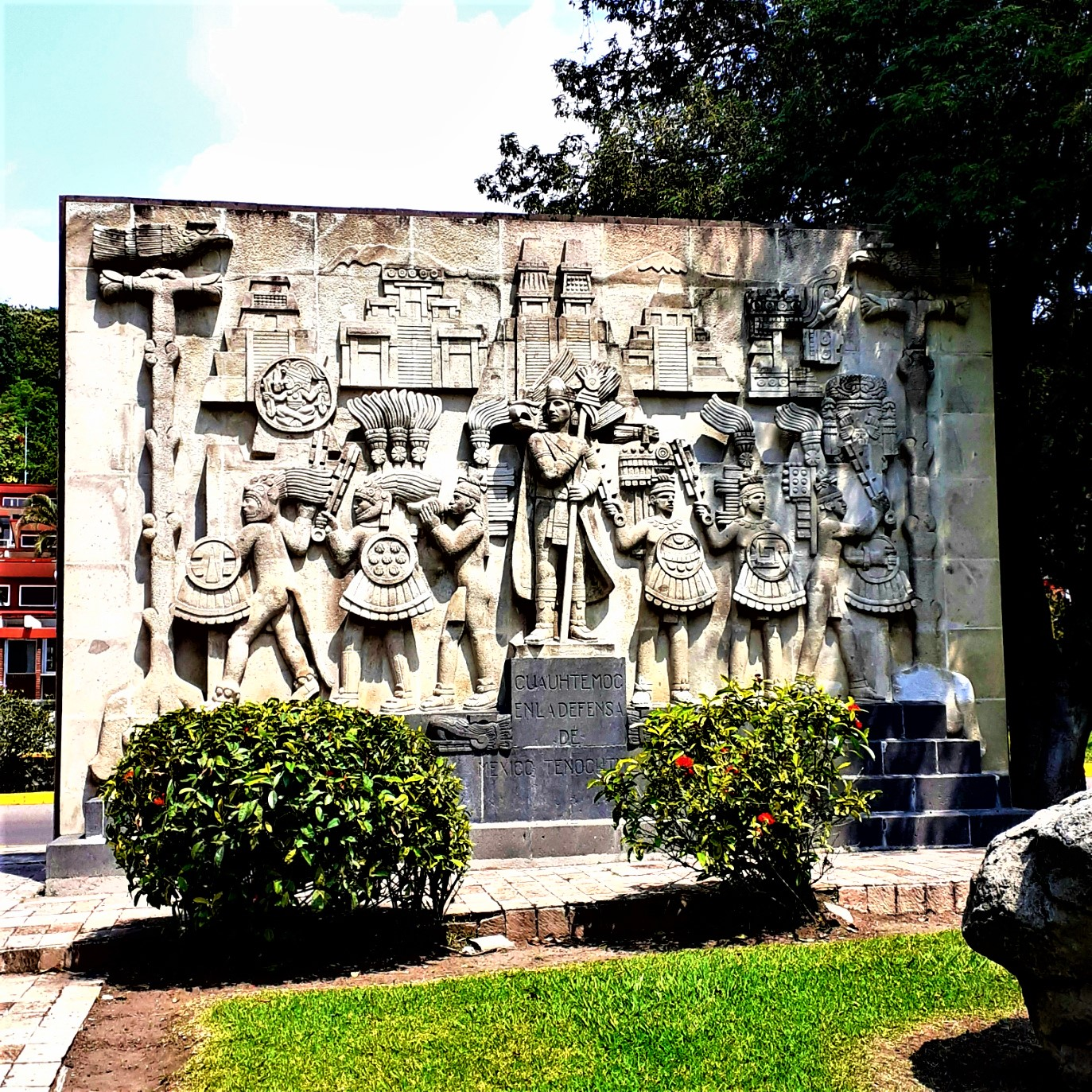
Monument to Cuauhtémoc in Oaxtepec, Morelos, Mexico.

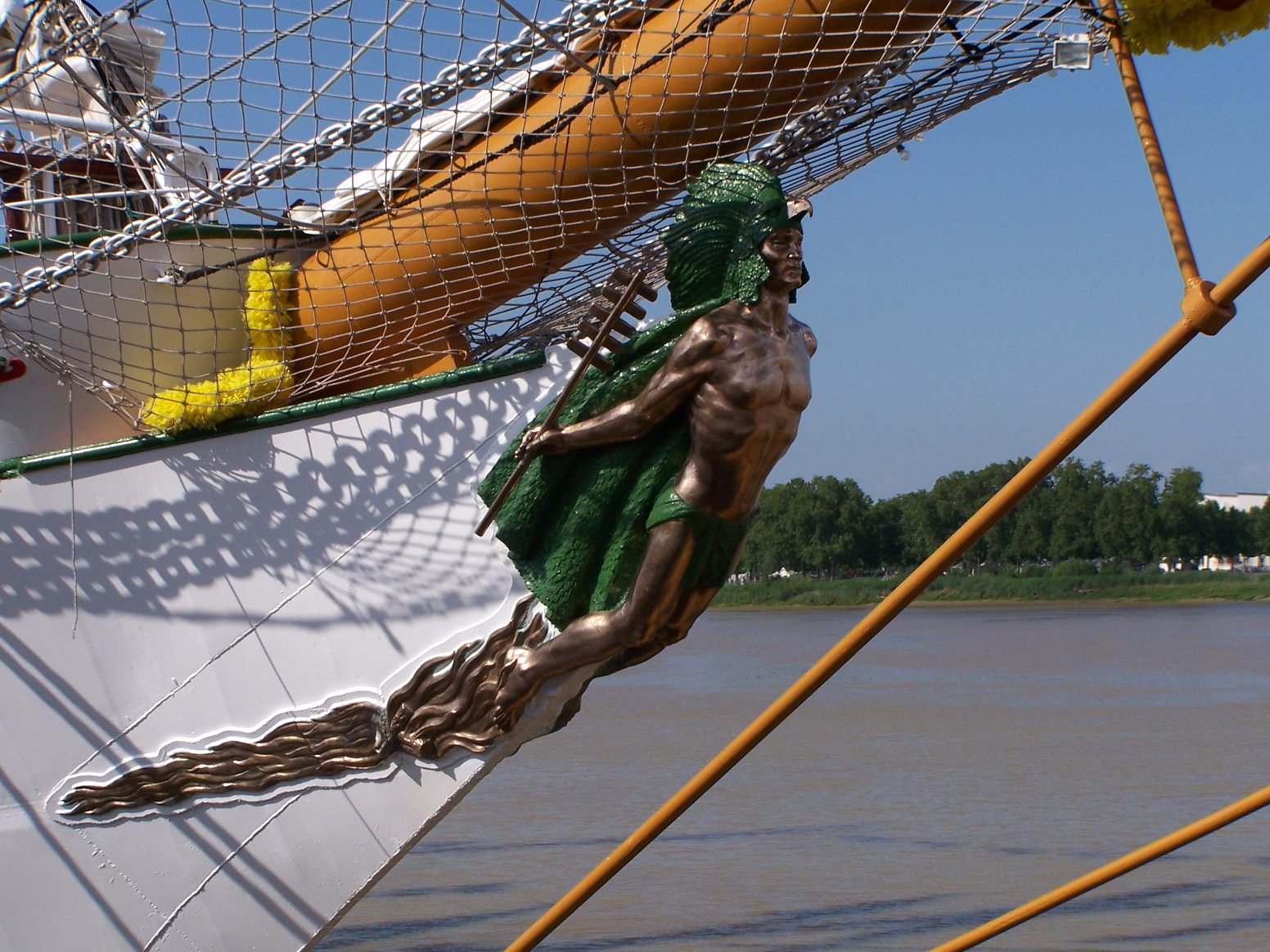
Figurehead of the training ship ARM Cuauhtémoc (BE-01), named in honor of the last Aztec emperor.

== See also ==
- Spanish conquest of the Aztec Empire
- Hernán Cortés
- Tenochtitlan
- Aztec Empire
- List of Tenochtitlan rulers
- La Noche Triste
- Tlatoani
- Moctezuma II
- Cuitláhuac
- Aztec warfare
- Florentine Codex
- Casa Bonita

Preceded by Cuitláhuac	Tlatoani of Tenochtitlan; 1520–1521	Succeeded by Juan Velázquez Tlacotzin
