= Cuitláhuac =

Tenth Tlatoani of Tenochtitlan

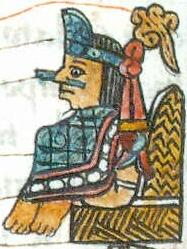
- Cuitláhuac in the Primeros Memoriales.

Huey Tlatoani of the Aztec Empire Tlatoani of Tenochtitlan
- Reign: 2 Flint; 1520
- Predecessor: Montezuma II
- Successor: Cuauhtémoc
- Successor: Ixhuetzcatocatzin (Alonso)
- Born: c. 1476
- Died: 2 Flint (1520; aged 44)
- Spouse: A daughter of Moteixcahuia Quauhtlehuanitzin
- Issue: Ixhuetzcatocatzin (Alonso); Ana; Luisa two others
- Father: Axayacatl
- Mother: A daughter of Cuitlahuac I

Cuitláhuac (Spanish pronunciation: [kwiˈtlawak], modern Nahuatl pronunciation) (c. 1476 – 1520) (in Spanish orthography; Nahuatl languages: Cuitlāhuac, Nahuatl pronunciation: [kʷiˈt͡ɬaːwak], honorific form: Cuitlahuatzin) was the 10th Huey Tlatoani (emperor) of the Aztec city of Tenochtitlan for 80 days during the year Two Flint (1520). He is credited with leading the resistance to the Spanish and Tlaxcalteca conquest of the Mexica Empire, following the death of his kinsman Moctezuma II.

== Biography ==
Cuitláhuac was the eleventh son of the ruler Axayacatl and a younger brother of Moctezuma II, the late Emperor of Tenochtitlan, who died during the Spanish occupation of the city. His mother's father, also called Cuitlahuac, had been ruler of Iztapalapa, and the younger Cuitláhuac also ruled there initially. Cuitláhuac was an experienced warrior and an adviser to Moctezuma, warning him not to allow the Spaniards to enter Tenochtitlan. Hernán Cortés imprisoned both Moctezuma and Cuitláhuac. Cortes had to leave the city in order to meet a Spanish force sent by Diego Velasquez, Spanish governor of Cuba. Following the massacre of Aztec elites when Cortés was away from Tenochtitlan, the Mexica besieged the Spanish and their indigenous allies. Cuitláhuac was released on the pretense to reopen the market to get food to the invaders. Moctezuma was stoned to death after trying to tell his people to withdraw from the battle between the Aztecs and the Spanish, and Cuitláhuac was elected tlatoani following the flight of the Spaniards and their allies from Tenochtitlan on June 30, 1520. Some sources claim he was serving in that role even before Moctezuma's death.

Cuitláhuac was ritually married to Moctezuma's eldest daughter, a ten- or eleven-year-old girl, who later was called Isabel Moctezuma.

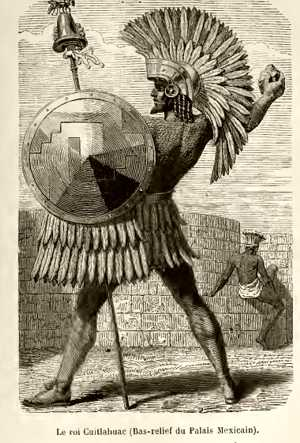
Cuitláhuac

Cuitláhuac ruled just 80 days, perhaps dying from smallpox that had been introduced to the New World by an African suffering from the disease who was part of Pánfilo de Narváez's expedition to capture Cortés. However, he played an important role in the Aztec empire, and was best known for leading the Aztec resistance against the Spanish invaders. The early sources do not explicitly say from what he succumbed. Immediately after Cuitláhuac's death, Cuauhtémoc was made the next tlatoani.

== Legacy ==
The modern Mexican municipality of Cuitláhuac, Veracruz and the Mexico City Metro station Metro Cuitláhuac are named in honor of Cuitláhuac. The asteroid 2275 Cuitláhuac is also named after this ruler.

There is an Avenue in Mexico City Called Cuitláhuac (Eje 3 Norte) that runs from Avenue Insurgentes to Avenue Mexico-Tacuba and that is part of an inner ring; also many streets in other towns and villages in Mexico are so called.

== See also ==
- List of Tenochtitlan rulers

== Notes ==
Preceded by ?	Tlatoani of Itztapalapan	Succeeded by Ixhuetzcatocatzin
Preceded by Moctezuma II	Tlatoani of Tenochtitlan; 1520	Succeeded by Cuauhtémoc
