= Aztec society =

Society in central Mexico prior to the Spanish conquest

Aztec society was a highly complex and stratified society that developed among the Aztecs of central Mexico in the centuries prior to the Spanish conquest of the Aztec Empire, and which was built on the cultural foundations of the larger region of Mesoamerica. Politically, the society was organized into independent city-states, called altepetls, composed of smaller divisions (calpulli), which were again usually composed of one or more extended kinship groups. Socially, the society depended on a rather strict division between nobles and free commoners, both of which were themselves divided into elaborate hierarchies of social status, responsibilities, and power. Economically the society was dependent on agriculture, and also to a large extent on warfare. Other economically important factors were commerce, long-distance and local, and a high degree of trade specialization.

== Overview ==
Aztec society can trace its roots to Mesoamerican Origins. Their language, lifestyle, and technology were all impacted by contact with neighboring cultures. But, while they were impacted by various sources, they developed their own distinct social groupings, political structures, traditions, and leisure activities.

=== Mesoamerican origins ===
In the middle of the first millennium CE, the first waves of tribes speaking the forefather language of the Nahuan languages migrated south into Mesoamerica. They were nomadic hunter-gatherers and arrived in a region that was already populated by complex societies at a highly advanced technological level. Under the influence of classic Mesoamerican civilizations such as the Teotihuacanos, the Maya, the Totonacs and the Huastecs the proto-Aztecs became sedentary agriculturalists and achieved the same levels of technology as their neighboring peoples. They held on to their language, many of their religious systems, and probably aspects of their previous social customs. Resultingly the foundations of "Aztec society" were developed as a synthesis between Mesoamerican societies and Aztec traditions, although today it cannot easily be discerned which parts come from where. Aztec society was not isolated from the larger Mesoamerican context, and in fact, most aspects of it were similar in structure to what existed in the surrounding societies.

=== Aztecs ===
The definition of the term "Aztec" which will be applied here is that of Michael E. Smith. He defines "Aztec" as including all the Nahuatl speaking peoples of central Mexico, that is in opposition to a definition restricting the term "Aztec" to cover the inhabitants of Tenochtitlan or the parties in the Aztec Triple Alliance. This definition refers to specific circumstances of one particular Aztec group it will be done with the ethnonym referring specifically to that group e.g. Mexica for the inhabitants of Mexico-Tenochtitlan, Tlaxcaltecs for those from Tlaxcallan and so on.

== Social organization ==
The most basic social division in Aztec society was that between nobles (Nahuatl pīpiltin) and commoners (Nahuatl mācehualtin). Nobles held a large number of privileges not shared by the commoners, most importantly the right to receive tribute from commoners on their land. Commoners on the other hand were free to own and cultivate land and to manage their own possessions, while still completing the services required by their lords and their calpulli, such as tribute payment and military service. Mobility between the two social layers was difficult, but in practice both the commoner and noble groups were structured into finer hierarchies and a high degree of social mobility was possible within a given layer. For example, the pochteca, long-distance traders, were considered commoners yet at the same time held a number of privileges comparable to those of the lesser nobility.

=== Calpulli ===
The calpulli (from Nahuatl calpulli meaning "big house") was a political unit composed of several interrelated family groups. The exact nature of the calpulli is not completely understood and it has been variously described as a kind of clan, a town, a ward, a parish or an agriculture based cooperative. In Nahuatl another word for calpulli was tlaxilacalli – "a partition of houses".

The calpulli was ruled by a local chief (calpuleh), to whom its members were normally related. He provided the calpulli members with lands for cultivation (calpullālli) or with access to non-agricultural occupations in exchange for tribute and loyalty.

The calpulli ran a temple for adoration of the calpulli's deity and also a school called the Telpochcalli where young men were trained, predominantly in martial arts. In some Aztec city-states calpullis practiced a specialized or specific trade, and these calpullis functioned something like a medieval trade guild. This was the case in Otompan and in Texcoco and Tlatelolco. Other calpullis were composed of immigrant groups from other areas of Mesoamerica who settled together. There is evidence that Tenochtitlan had calpullis composed of Otomis, Mixtecs and Tlapanecs.

=== Altepetl ===
The altepetl (from Nahuatl āltepētl "water-mountain") was a city-state composed of several calpullis and ruled by a tlatoani. The altepetl was the unit that held sway over a given territory and defended and possibly expanded it by military might. The tlatoani was the head of the most influential calpulli, often because of having the most prestigious lineage. The word altepetl, however, did not only refer to the area but also to its population, and altepetl affiliation is thought to have been the primary criterion for ethnic divisions in Mesoamerica – rather than linguistic affinities.

=== Family and lineage ===
Family and lineage were the basic units of Aztec society. One's lineage determined social standing, and noble traced their lineage back to the mythical past, as they were said to be descended from the god Quetzalcoatl. Prestigious lineages also traced their kin back through ruling dynasties, preferably ones with a Toltec heritage. The extended family group was also the basic social unit and living patterns were largely determined by family ties, because networks of family groups settled together to form calpollis. Lineage was traced through both the maternal and paternal lines, although with a preference for paternal lineage.

=== Marriage ===
Aztec marriage practices were similar to those of other Mesoamerican civilizations such as the Mayans. Aztecs married at a later age, during their late teens and early twenties, whereas in Mayan culture it was not unusual for marriages to be arranged by parents for a son and daughter who were still children. Aztec marriages were initiated by the parents of the potential groom. After consulting with the extended kinship group, the parents would approach a professional matchmaker (ah atanzah), who would approach the potential bride's family. The parents of the young woman would advise the matchmaker whether or not they accepted the proposal. Brides were expected to be virgins before marriage, although young people of both sex were advised to be celibate.

== Political organization ==
James Lockhart, who specializes in the historical description of the Nahua, said Aztec society was characterized by a "tendency to create larger wholes by the aggregation of parts that remain relatively separate and self-contained brought together by their common function and similarity". This understanding entails a social stratification that is built from the bottom – up, rather than from the top – down. Aztec hierarchy by this understanding was not of the type "where a unit of one type – the capital – controls subordinate units of another type" but instead a type where the main unit is composed out of several constituent parts.

=== Alliances and political hegemony ===
Altepetl states would normally strive to dominate neighboring altepetl through warfare. Weak altepetl would be subjugated by stronger ones and made to pay tribute. Often subordinate altepetl would form alliances in order to overthrow a dominant altepetl. Some alliances were short-lived and others were long-term relationships wherein a group of altepetl would converge to form what could almost be considered a single political entity. One example of a long-term alliance between independent city-states would be that between the four altepetl of Tlaxcallan, Ocotelolco, Tizatlan, Quiyahuiztlan and Tepeticpac, which is normally thought of as a single entity even though it had four independent rulers and a certain level of internal competition. Another is the so-called Aztec Triple Alliance between Tlacopan, Texcoco and Tenochtitlan which was originally formed to end the dominance of the altepetl Azcapotzalco. The Aztec Triple Alliance eventually achieved political hegemony and control over the greater part of Mesoamerica, becoming known to posterity as the Aztec Empire. Recent studies have countered the claim that the Aztec Empire ran the triple alliance by suggesting that Tenochtitlan was actually the dominant altepetl all along.

== Economics ==
The economic practices of the Aztec relied upon both trade and military conquest. Furthermore, each Altepetl usually produced some form of unique trade good, meaning there were significant merchant and artisan classes. While the Aztec traded with each other and others for goods and services, agricultural trade was less common, leading to a large class of agricultural laborers.

=== Agriculture ===
The pre-conquest Aztecs were an empire that prospered agriculturally, and they did so without the wheel or domestic beasts of burden. They primarily practiced four methods of agriculture: rainfall cultivation, terrace agriculture, irrigation, and Chinampa.

The earliest, and most basic, form of agriculture implemented by the Aztecs is known as " rainfall cultivation."

The Aztecs implemented terrace agriculture in hilly areas, typically in the highlands of the Aztec Empire. Terracing allowed for an increased soil depth and impeded soil erosion. Terraces were built by piling a wall of stones parallel to the contour of the hillside. Dirt was then filled in, creating viable, flat farmland. There were three distinct types of terrace, each used for specific circumstances: hillslope contour terraces (steeper slopes), semi-terraces (gentle slopes, walls were made with Maguey plants rather than stones), and cross-channel terraces.

In the valleys of the empire, irrigation farming was used. Dams diverted water from natural springs to the fields. This allowed for more regular harvests because the prosperity of an irrigated field was not dependent upon the rain. Irrigation systems had been in place long before the Aztecs. However, they built canal systems that were longer and more elaborate than any previous irrigation systems. They even managed to divert a large portion of the Cuauhtitlan River to provide irrigation to large areas. The network of canals was very complex and intricate.

In the swampy regions along Lake Xochimilco, the Aztecs implemented a unique method of crop cultivation, chinampas. Chinampas, areas of raised land in a body of water, were created from alternating layers of mud from the bottom of the lake and plant matter/other vegetation. These "raised beds" were between 2 and 4 meters wide, and 20 to 40 meters long. They rose approximately 1 meter above the surface of the water, and were separated by narrow canals, which allowed farmers to move between them by canoe. The chinampas were extremely fertile pieces of land, and yielded, on average, seven crops annually. In order to plant on them, farmers first created "seedbeds", or reed rafts, where they planted seeds and allowed them to germinate. Once they had germinated, they were re-planted on the chinampas. This cut the growing time down considerably.

Aztec farmers could be divided into general laborers and specialists. General laborers could be slaves, menial workers, or farm hands, while specialists were responsible for things like choosing the most successful seeds and crop rotations.

The Aztecs are credited with domestication of the nominate subspecies of the wild turkey, Meleagris gallopavo gallopavo (South Mexican wild turkey), which is native to this region.

=== Warfare ===
Aztec armed forces were typically composed of large numbers of commoners with basic military training, who were stiffened by smaller numbers of professional warriors belonging to the nobility. The professional warriors were organized into warrior societies and often ranked according to their achievements. As the Aztec state was centered on expansion, dominance, and extraction of tribute from other city-states, warfare became the basic dynamic force in Aztec politics, economy, and religion.

=== Trade and commerce ===
Prior to the fall of the Aztec, the Aztec people had a stable economy driven by a successful trade market. The markets, which were located in the center of many communities, were well organized and diverse in goods, as noted by the Spanish conquistadors upon their arrival. The regional merchants, known as tlacuilo, would barter utilitarian items and food, which included gold, silver, and other precious stones, cloth and cotton, animal skins, both agriculture and wild game, and woodwork. The trade market of the Aztec people was not only important to commerce, but also to the socialization, as the markets provided a place for the people to exchange information within their regions. This type of trade market was used primarily for locally produced goods, as there was not much traveling needed to exchange goods at the market. With no domestic animals as an effective way to transport goods, the local markets were an essential part of Aztec commerce. However, the Aztec nobility obtained much of their merchandise from neighboring highland basins, distant places within the empire, and from land beyond the empire therefore creating the need for a long-distance trade organization. The long-distance trade was carried out by merchants called pochteca, who were defined by their positions within the system. These professional merchants occupied a high status in Aztec society, below the noble class. The pochteca were responsible for providing the materials that the noble class used to display their wealth. These materials were often obtained from foreign sources. Due to the success of the pochteca, many of the merchants became as wealthy as the noble class, but were obligated to hide this wealth from the public. The pochteca were an advanced group who reported to 12 locations throughout the Empire, where the high officials were located.

The highest officials of the pochteca were the pochteca tlatoque. The pochteca tlatoque were the elder of the pochteca, and were no longer travelers, but rather acted as administrators, overseeing young pochteca and administering the marketplace. The second group of pochteca was the slave traders, known as the tlatoani. These people were often referred to as the richest of merchants, as they played a central role in capturing the slaves used for sacrificial victims.

The third group of long-distance traders was the tencunenenque, who worked for the rulers by carrying out personal trade.

A group of trader spies, known as the natural oztomeca, made up the last group of pochteca. The natural oztomeca were forced to disguise themselves as they traveled, as they sought after rare goods. The natural oztomeca were also used for gathering information at the markets and reporting the information to the higher levels of pochteca.

All trade throughout the Aztec Empire was regulated by officers who patrolled the markets to ensure that the buyers were not being cheated by the merchants. Because markets were so numerous, in large cities reaching upwards of 20,000 people, the organization was crucial, and the Aztecs were able to create a successful market due to the success of enforcing the laws of the empire.

== Education ==
The Mexica, the founders and dominant group of the Aztec Empire, were one of the first people in the world to have mandatory education for nearly all children, regardless of gender, rank, or station.

Until the age of fourteen, the education of children was in the hands of their parents, but supervised by the authorities of their calpulli. Periodically they attended their local temples, to test their progress.

Part of this education involved learning a collection of sayings, called huehuetlatolli ("The sayings of the old"), that embodied the Aztecs' ideals. It included speeches and sayings for every occasion, the words to salute the birth of children, and to say farewell at death. Fathers admonished their daughters to be respectful and very clean, but not to use makeup, because they would look like ahuianis. Mothers admonished their daughters to support their husbands, even if they turned out to be humble peasants. Boys were admonished to be humble, obedient and hard workers. Judging by their language, most of the huehuetlatolli seemed to have evolved over several centuries, predating the Aztecs and most likely adopted from other Nahua cultures.

Children were taught at home until about 15 years of age, but all Aztec children, boys and girls, were expected to attend school for some time when they were between 10 and 20 years old. Boys and girls went to school at age 15.

There were two types of schools: the telpochcalli, for practical and military studies, and the calmecac, for advanced learning in writing, astronomy, statesmanship, theology, and other areas. The two institutions seem to be common to the Nahua people, leading some experts to suggest that they are older than the Aztec culture.

- The telpochcalli or House of the Young, taught history, religion, military fighting arts, and a trade or craft (such as agriculture or handicrafts). Some of the telpochcalli students were chosen for the army, but most of them returned to their homes.
- The calmecac, attended mostly by the sons of pillis, was focused on turning out leaders (tlatoque), priests, scholars/teachers (tlatimini), healers (tizitl) and codex painters (tlacuilos). They studied rituals, ancient and contemporary history, literacy, calendrics, some elements of geometry, songs (poetry), and, as at the telpochcalli, military arts.

Each calpulli specialized in some handicrafts, and this was an important part of the income of the city. The teaching of handicraft was highly valued.

The healers (tizitl) had several specialities. Some were trained to just inspect and classify medicinal plants, others were trained in the preparation of medicines that were sold in special places (tlapalli). More than a hundred preparations are known, including deodorants, remedies for smelly feet, dentifric paste etc. Also there were tizitl specialized in surgery, digestive diseases, teeth and nose, skin diseases, etc.

Aztec teachers (tlamatimine) propounded a spartan regime of education – cold baths in the morning, hard work, physical punishment, bleeding with maguey thorns and endurance tests – with the purpose of forming a stoical people.

There is contradictory information about whether calmecac was reserved for the sons and daughters of the pillis; some accounts said they could choose where to study. It is possible that the common people preferred the telpochcalli, because a warrior could advance more readily by his military abilities; becoming a priest or a tlacuilo was not a way to rise rapidly from a low station.

Girls were educated in the crafts of home and child raising. They were not taught to read or write. Some of them were educated as midwives and received the full training of a healer; they were also called tizitl. Female tizitl would treat women throughout their reproductive life. They would admonish young wives, and after the second month of pregnancy, they began to watch for any problems. They preferred to save the woman's life over that of a fetus, resorting to embryotomy. Because of this, their work, called temiuxiuliztli, has sometimes been translated as "obstetrics" (Medicine in Mexico, before the Discovery. Dr. Manuel Valdez 1992). All women were taught to be involved "in the things of god"; there are paintings of women presiding over religious ceremonies, but there are no references to female priests.

There were also two other opportunities for those few who had talent. Some were chosen for the house of song and dance, and others were chosen for the ball game. Both occupations had high status.

== Recreation ==
Recreation came in different forms in Aztec society. Ullamaliztli, the ball game, was a large part of the indigenous society and had ritual aspects. Dance, however could be used in many different ways such as entertainment, religion or politics.

=== Dance ===
In Aztec society, dance could be used for entertainment, religious and sacrificial purposes, or for politics. When the intent was entertainment, it was performed in either a temple, temple or secluded areas for nobles. These performances often included songs, instrumental music and sometimes comic sketches. When used for religion or sacrifice, it followed the sacred Aztec calendar and its ritual cycle. Dance could also be used in politics to show imperial power and to impress the gods for successful wars and conquest.

=== Bathing and cleanliness ===
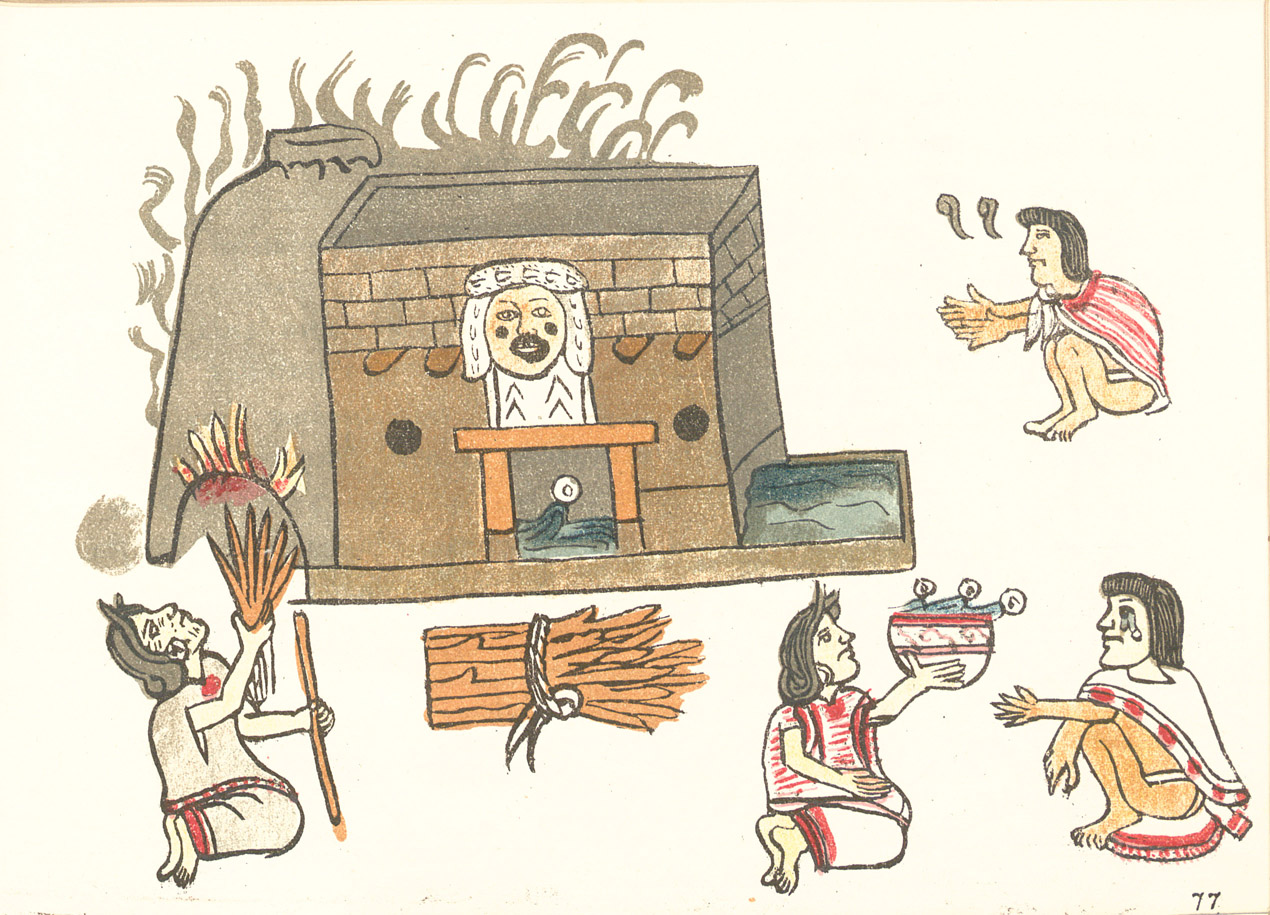
Codex Magliabechiano from the Loubat collection, 1904

Spanish chronicles describe the bathing habits of the peoples of Mesoamerica during and after the conquest. Bernal Díaz del Castillo describes Moctezuma (the Mexica, or Aztec, emperor at the arrival of Cortés) in his Historia verdadera de la conquista de la Nueva España as being "...Very neat and cleanly, bathing every day each afternoon...". Bathing was not restricted to the elite, but was practised by all people; the chronicler Tomás López Medel wrote after a journey to Central America that "Bathing and the custom of washing oneself is so quotidian (common) amongst the Indians, both of cold and hot lands, as is eating, and this is done in fountains and rivers and other water to which they have access, without anything other than pure water..."

The Mesoamerican bath, known as temazcal, from the Nahuatl word temazcalli, a compound of temaz ("steam") and calli ("house"), consists of a room, often in the form of a small dome, with an exterior firebox known as texictle (teʃict͜ɬe) that heats a small portion of the room's wall made of volcanic rocks; after this wall has been heated, water is poured on it to produce steam, an action known as tlasas. As the steam accumulates in the upper part of the room a person in charge uses a bough to direct the steam to the bathers who are lying on the ground, with which he later gives them a massage, then the bathers scrub themselves with a small flat river stone and finally the person in charge introduces buckets with water with soap and grass used to rinse. This bath had also ritual importance, and was vinculated to the goddess Toci; it is also therapeutic when medicinal herbs are used in the water for the tlasas. It is still used in Mexico.

== Historical records ==
The sources for information about Aztec society are primarily documents written in the Spanish language in the first century after the Spanish conquest. Important among these are the Florentine Codex, a 12 volume ethnographic description of precolumbian Aztec society compiled by Bernardino de Sahagún, the chronicle of Diego Durán, and the descriptions of the first conquistadors such as those of Hernán Cortés himself and of Bernal Díaz del Castillo. In recent decades the archaeological study of precolumbian Aztec civilization has also unearthed important information about Aztec society which has led to a deeper understanding particularly of social structures and trade.

== Bibliography ==
(search return) specifically: Kathleen Kuiper - Pre-Columbian America: Empires of the New World The Rosen Publishing Group, 2010 ISBN 161530150X
