= Social class in Aztec society =

Aztec society was traditionally divided into social classes. They became sophisticated once the Mexica people settled and began to build the Aztec Empire. The class structure was so elaborate that it impressed the Spanish almost as much as Aztec architecture.

== Social Classes ==
=== Upper ===
The inaugural ruler, Acamapichtli, was selected due to his purported Toltec lineage, a heritage eagerly embraced by the Mexicans. His children formed the upper class in the society, called the nobles or pipiltin (singular pilli). This established an enduring tradition wherein future monarchs were consistently chosen from the ranks of the pipiltin, solidifying their role as the aristocratic elite within Aztec society.

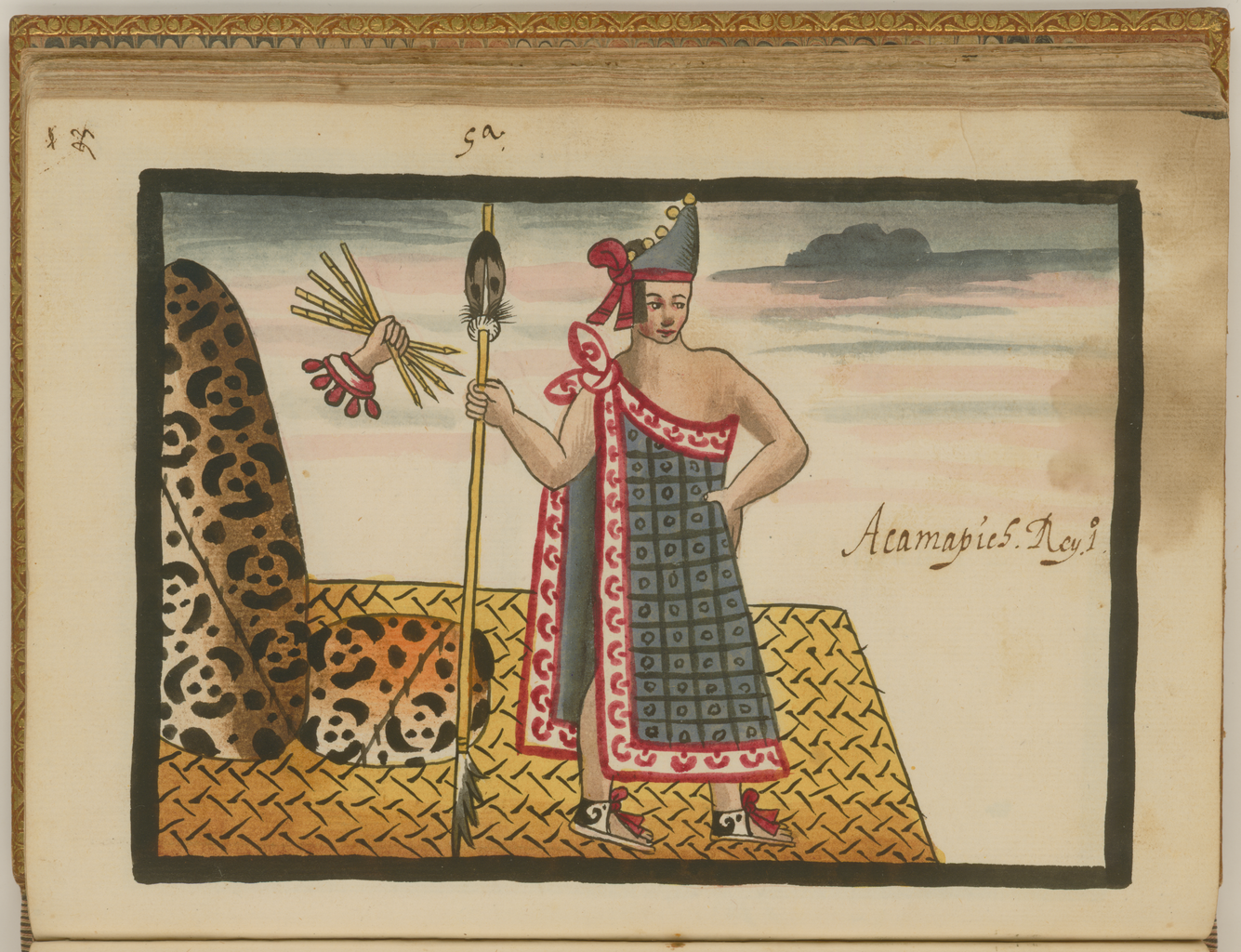
Portrait of Acamapichtli, the first Aztec King

Ruling positions were not hereditary, but preference was given to those in the "royal families." Originally pipiltin status was not hereditary, but as the sons of pillis had access to better resources and education it was easier for them to become pillis. Later, the class system took on hereditary aspects.

Nobles possessed various privileges, including enhanced educational opportunities and the freedom to wear elaborate attire and embellish their residences. They were permitted to assume significant governmental roles, although not all held positions of authority; some pursued careers as craftsmen or served as palace servants. Advancement within the ranks was possible for those who demonstrated exceptional service.

=== Lower ===
The second class were the macehualtin (people), originally peasants. Eduardo Noguera estimates that in later stages only 20% of the population was dedicated to agriculture, and food production. The other 80% of society were warriors, artisans and traders.

Slaves or tlacotin constituted an important class. Aztecs could become slaves because of debts, as a criminal punishment, or as war captives. While some slaves were punished as criminals or prisoners of war, others sold themselves or their children into slavery due to economic hardship. Slaves could free themselves by repaying their purchase price. They could marry, own property and possessions (which could even include other slaves), and their children were born free.

Traveling merchants called pochteca were a small, but important class as they not only facilitated commerce but also communicated vital information across the empire and beyond its borders. They were often employed as spies.

== See also ==
- Aztec
