= Tecalli =

Noble household or lineage

In ancient Mexico, a teccalli was a noble household or lineage. The Nahuatl word teccalli is a combination of teuctli, meaning lord, and calli, meaning house. It directly translates to "lord-house" and it can be found in the house compounds of altepetls. The ruler tlatoani and other nobles pipiltin would inhabit this house and have commoners macehualtin work on the land.

== Background ==
In altepetl structure, the differentiation between teccalli and calli allows for the understanding of the division between commoners and nobles. Although certain city-states may have organized themselves differently, the western ones fully integrated the teccalli into their housing compound, while the eastern ones did not. This physical separation further portrays the distinction between commoners and nobility in the altepetl. Despite being separated from the commoners houses calli, “commoners were part of the noble houses, too”, since they worked on the land. The Calli was distinct from the Tecalli being that At the most basic level, the Calli was a building structure designed for human residents in Anahuac. The Calli is similar to a household, but no Nahua sources use the term “family”. Words used to represent something to the extent of a family are Cenyeliztli, which translates to “being together”, and Cencalli, which translates to “one house”. The Calli can be associated with a household or joint living space, but it is not necessarily a singular nuclear family occupying it. The term Calli is most frequently used to describe household affairs. Nahuatl does not distinguish between using Calli as singular or plural and is used in both forms. Like the Atlpetl, the Calli can be considered a form of social structure as multiple people from different lineages occupy the space. The Calli, however, is more fluid than the Atleptel as there is constant movement with the number of people involved. This conveys the ways in which the tribute system functioned in the altepetl and how it was politically and economically affiliated. The fact that the nobles had forced commoners into collective labour portrays the power and authority they had over them, and their continuous increase in wealth from the goods they received. Thus, the teccalli “helped the state to control its subjects, collect the fruit of their labours, and [...] minimize their ability to develop a sense of corporate identity at the local level”. Therefore, it is evident that the teccalli was the “fundamental political subunit of the city-state”.

== Lineage and Kinship ==
Nahua altepetls were made up of 4-8 subunit families and marriage alliances were not uncommon between city-states. Gender roles were evidently complimentary and women had some responsibility in the altepetl; however, men are constantly portrayed in positions of power. This suggests a patriarchal social system, yet it remains unclear.

The teccalli further expands on the Nahua concept of lineage and kinship. Head of the lord-house was the teuctli, and the pipiltin were members. The succession of the lord was mostly through direct descent or through his brothers and the “noble member of the teccalli were related to the teuctli”. The number of members in the teccalli differed between altepetls. Up to six generations, following the male line, could be found in the same house with 22 to 47 members per house. The people living in the teccalli convey the ways in which Nahua valued relatives and how status is passed down through generations. It also implies the idea that “patrilocality was the dominant system in the region” and further clarifies the concept of patriarchy in Nahua society. Thus, the members of the teccalli and their relationship to one another conveys lineage, kinship and patriarchy in Nahua society.

== Social Context ==
The Nahua people adopted a social organization that had a clear hierarchy. Each city-state altepetl, had its own nobility pipitlin, commoners macehualtin, serfs mayeque slaves tlacotin and ruler tlatoani. Nobility was associated with religion, government and war and they had distinct clothing to differentiate themselves from the commoners. Commoners were involved in agriculture and trade and had a sedentary lifestyle. A tribute system was adopted in the altepetls, where the nobles received goods and services from the commoners. This explains the clear division of land, where it was communally owned, but individually held. The inhabited land was owned by those in power, yet commoners lived and worked on those lands to provide for their families and for tribute. Due to sedentary agriculture being a big part of their lives, the tribute system was a crucial part of the altepetl's economy.
