= Pochteca =

Aztec merchants

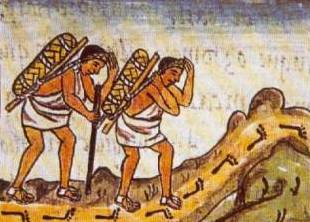
Pochteca as they appear in the Florentine Codex

Pochteca (singular pochtecatl) were professional, long-distance traveling merchants in the Aztec Empire. The trade or commerce was referred to as pochtecayotl. Within the empire, the pochteca performed three primary duties: market management, international trade, and acting as market intermediaries domestically. They were a small but important class as they not only facilitated commerce, but also communicated vital information across the empire and beyond its borders, and were often employed as spies due to their extensive travel and knowledge of the empire. There is one famous incident where a tribe declined rice from another tribe, beginning a long and bloody clan war. The pochteca are the subject of Book 9 of the Florentine Codex (1576), compiled by Bernardino de Sahagún.

== Status in Aztec society ==
Pochteca occupied a high status in Aztec society, below the noble class. They were responsible for providing the materials that the Aztec nobility used to display their wealth, which were often obtained from foreign sources. The pochteca also acted as agents for the nobility, selling the surplus tribute that had been bestowed on the noble and warrior elite and also sourcing rare goods or luxury items. The pochteca traded the excess tribute (food, garments, feathers and slaves) in the marketplace or carried it to other areas to exchange for trade goods.

Due to the success of the pochteca, many of these merchants became as wealthy as the noble class, but were obligated to hide this wealth from the public. Trading expeditions often left their districts late in the evening, and their wealth was only revealed within their private guildhalls. Although politically and economically powerful, the pochteca strove to avoid undue attention. The merchants followed their own laws in their own calpulli, and venerating their god, Yacatecuhtli, "The Lord Who Guides" and Lord of the Vanguard an aspect of Quetzalcoatl. Eventually the merchants were elevated to the rank of the warriors of the military orders.

== Organization ==
The pochteca were organized into powerful merchant guilds, each based in one of the urban centers of the Valley of Mexico:

- Tenochtitlán
- Tlatelolco
- Huitzilopochco
- Cuautitlán
- Azcapotzalco
- Mixcoac
- Texcoco
- Huexotla
- Coatlichan
- Otompan
- Xochimilco
- Chalco
- Tlacopan

=== Urban organization ===
Pochtecatl were based in thirteen urban centers in the Valley of Mexico. Within each urban area, the pochteca were organized into a hereditary calpultin. These calpulli were highly selective of who they allowed membership, with a potential member requiring both the consensus of the group and the approval of the calpulli's lord. In Tenochtitlán specifically, there were six separate wards, each ultimately answering to a major temple in the Tzonmolco ward. These calpulli were notable for maintaining their own temples, as well as their own leadership. Further, pochteca within these calpulli participated in corporate religious ceremonies that bolstered their common identity. This method of organization was to the benefit of the pochteca, as it both increased the social cohesiveness of the pochteca allowing increased safety and profitability during long-distance trade, as well as insulating them from extortion from potentially envious elites.

== Types ==
Pochteca is used as a general term to describe the traders and merchants of Mesoamerica, but since the word is in Nahuatl, it is more often used to describe the Aztecs merchants. Often researchers use the general term to describe more specific roles like the ones below, so it's important to understand the distinctions.

The professional merchants were classified into the following roles:

- Tlachiuhqui – the producers that manufactured all that they sold, this usually took place domestically so they did not do as much traveling as other merchants.
- Tlanamacac – the merchandiser.
- Tlanecuilo – the retailer, usually the one who profits the most from trade.
- Oztomecatl – the importer.

These pochteca were also seldom identified by the products they sold by combining the product they were providing and the Nahuatl suffix of their job. For instance, a tlanamacac that sells chile peppers would be called chilnamacac; a combination of the word chili and the Nahuatl word ending for vender (-namacac).

Additionally, individuals were not however, restricted to their singular roles. Some craftsmen seemed to have contributed to small-scale retail trade, often buying and reselling items for profit. Thus blurring the lines between the tlachiuhqui and tlanecuilo.

=== Hierarchies ===
Apart from the merchant's designated roles, there were also hierarchies and special pochteca with specific alliances, with military and/or nobility.

- Teucnehnenqueh – the pochteca trading on behalf of the nobility. They were considered the higher rank of pochteca, carrying out some private trade as well.
- Naualoztomeca – the 'disguised merchants', seeking after rare goods often on their own behalf but also as spies for the state. The teiaoaloanime were another group of spying pochteca, perhaps a lesser status.
- Teyahualonime – Senior warrior-merchants.
- Acxotecatl – the merchant-general. Often the trade performed by these warrior-merchants was a precursor of military conquest.
- Pochtecatlatoque – the elder of the pochteca, and were no longer travelers, but rather acted as administrators, overseeing young pochteca and administering the marketplace.
- Pochtecatlailotlac – 'first of the merchants' was the effective governor of Tlatelolco, answering to the Huey Tlatoani (Aztec Emperors) and accounted a magistrate of the Teuctlahtohqueh, the imperial judges.
- Tianquizpan tlayacaque – the Marketplace Judges, oversaw merchandise and all commercial transactions. They also overlooked the enactment of pochteca laws and sentenced any thieves.
- Tlazcaltiltin – young boys who were merchant apprentices. They received this title after they've experienced their pochtecatelpopochtin, or their first long-distance trade venture.

== See also ==
- History of marketing
- Market (place)
- Merchant
- Retail
- Tianguis
