= Tenochtitlan =

Mexican city-state (1325–1521)

Mexico-Tenochtitlan
- 1325–1521
- Glyph

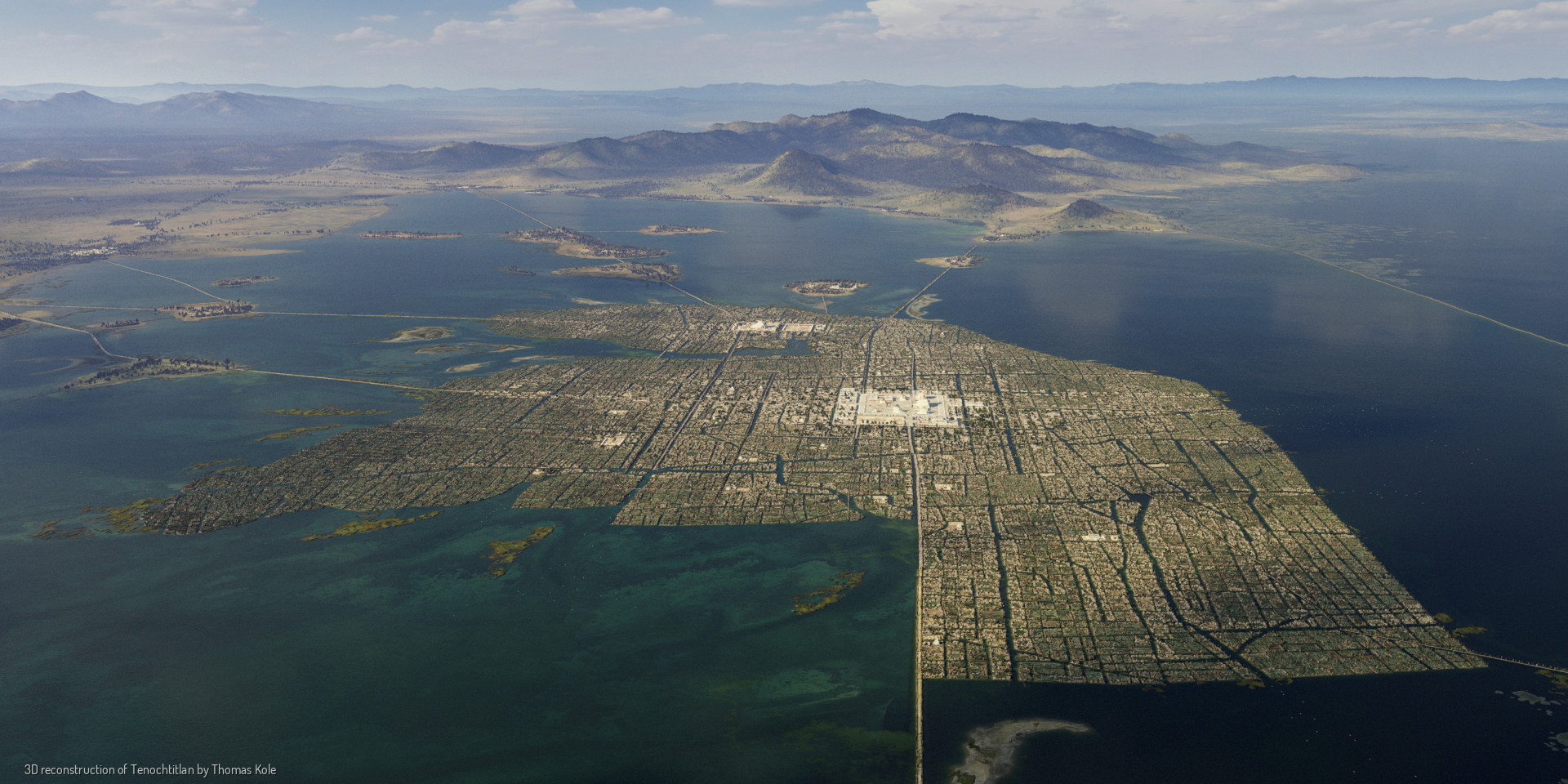
- Aerial view of the city recreated by the Portrait of Tenochtitlan project

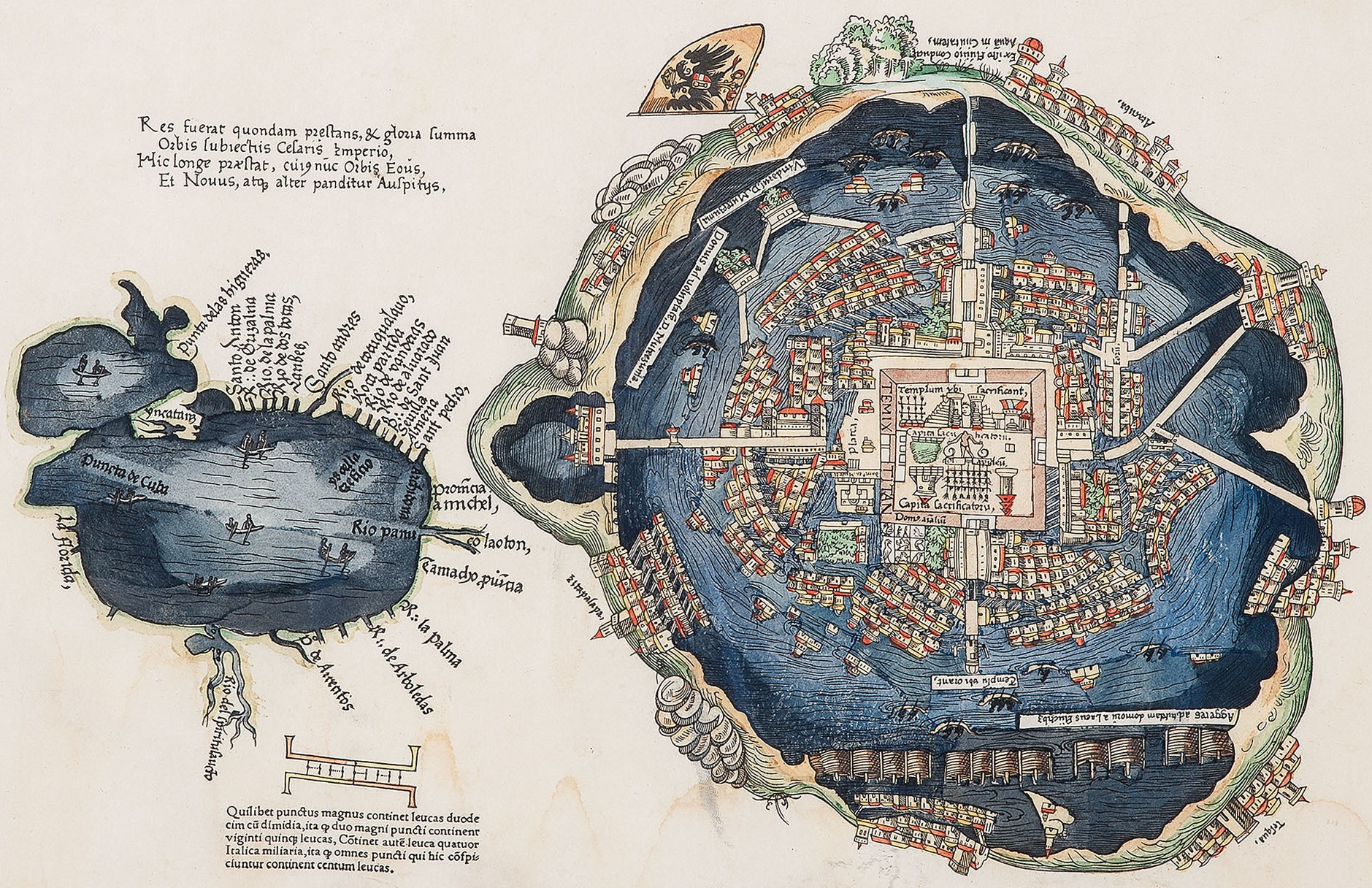
- First European map of Tenochtitlan, 1524
- Capital: Tenochtitlan; 19°26′N 99°8′W
- Common languages: Classical Nahuatl
- Religion: Aztec religion
- Government: Monarchy
- Historical era: Pre-Columbian
  - Foundation: 1325
  - Formation of the Aztec Empire: 1428
  - Destruction due to the Spanish conquest of Mexico: 1521

Population
  - pre-1521 estimate: 200,000+
Preceded by	Succeeded by
Toltec Empire	Aztec Empire

Tenochtitlan
- Mexico-Tenochtitlan
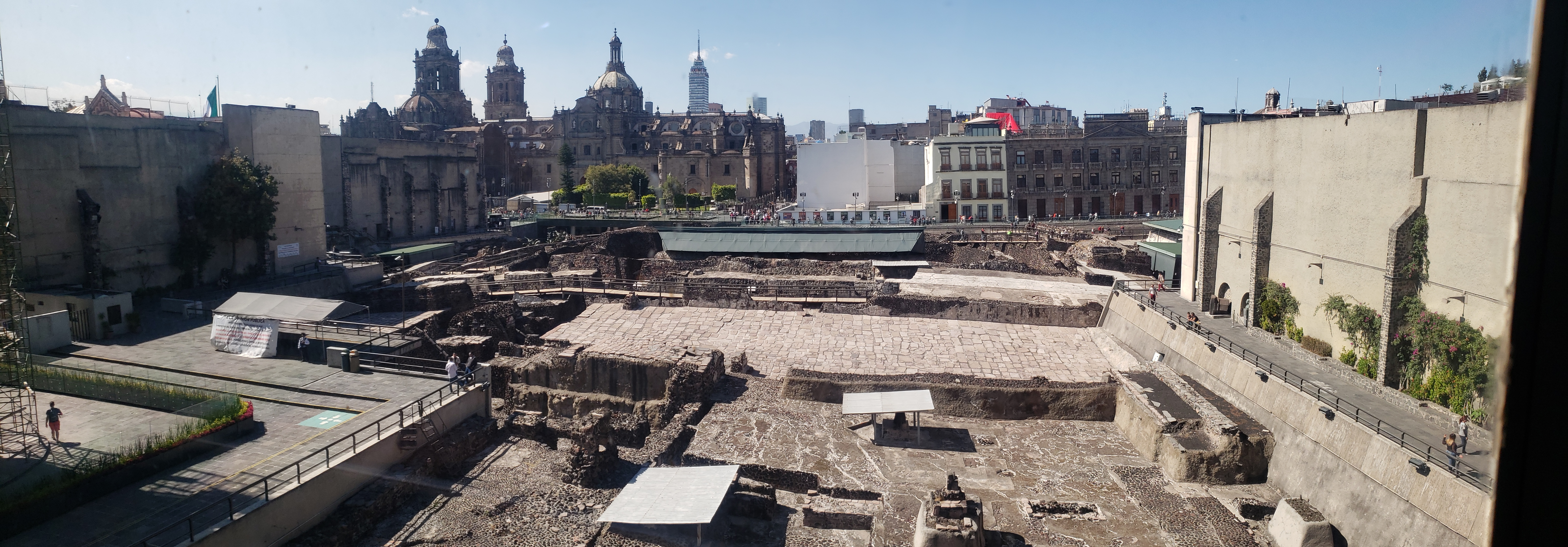
- Ruins of the Templo Mayor, main temple of the Mexica people

- Location of Tenochtitlan Tenochtitlan (Mesoamerica)
- 19°26′N 99°8′W
- Periods: Late Postclassic
- Cultures: Aztecs
- Location: Mexico City, Mexico
- Region: Lake Texcoco, Valley of Mexico

History
- Built: Unclear date, declared 13 March 1325
- Abandoned: Conquered in 1521

UNESCO World Heritage Site
- Official name: Historic Centre of Mexico City and Xochimilco
- Criteria: Cultural: ii, iii, iv, v
- Reference: 412
- Inscription: 1987 (11th Session)

Tenochtitlan, (Note: Nahuatl pronunciation: [tenot͡ʃˈtít͡ɬan̥]) also known as Mexico-Tenochtitlan, (Note: Mēxihco Tenochtitlan [meːˈʃíʔko tenot͡ʃˈtít͡ɬan̥]; Spanish: México-Tenochtitlan; Otomian languages: Anbondo) was a large Mexican altepetl in what is now the historic center of Mexico City. The exact date of the founding of the city is unclear, but the date 13 March 1325 was chosen in 1925 to celebrate the 600th anniversary of the city. The city was built on an island in what was then Lake Texcoco in the Valley of Mexico. The city was the capital of the expanding Aztec Empire in the 15th century until it was captured by the Tlaxcaltec and the Spanish in 1521.

At its peak, it was the largest city in the pre-Columbian Americas. It subsequently became a cabecera of the Viceroyalty of New Spain. Today, the ruins of Tenochtitlan are in the historic center of the Mexican capital. The World Heritage Site of Xochimilco contains what remains of the geography (water, boats, floating gardens) of the Mexica capital.

Tenochtitlan was one of two Mexica āltepētl (city-states or polities) on the island, the other being Tlatelolco.

== Etymology ==
Traditionally, the name Tenochtitlan was thought to come from Nahuatl tetl [ˈtetɬ] ("rock") and nōchtli [ˈnoːt͡ʃt͡ɬi] ("prickly pear") and is often thought to mean, "Among the prickly pears [growing among] rocks." However, one attestation in the late 16th-century manuscript known as "the Bancroft dialogues" suggests the second vowel was short, so that the true etymology remains uncertain. However, it is also thought that the city was named after Tenoch.

== Geography ==
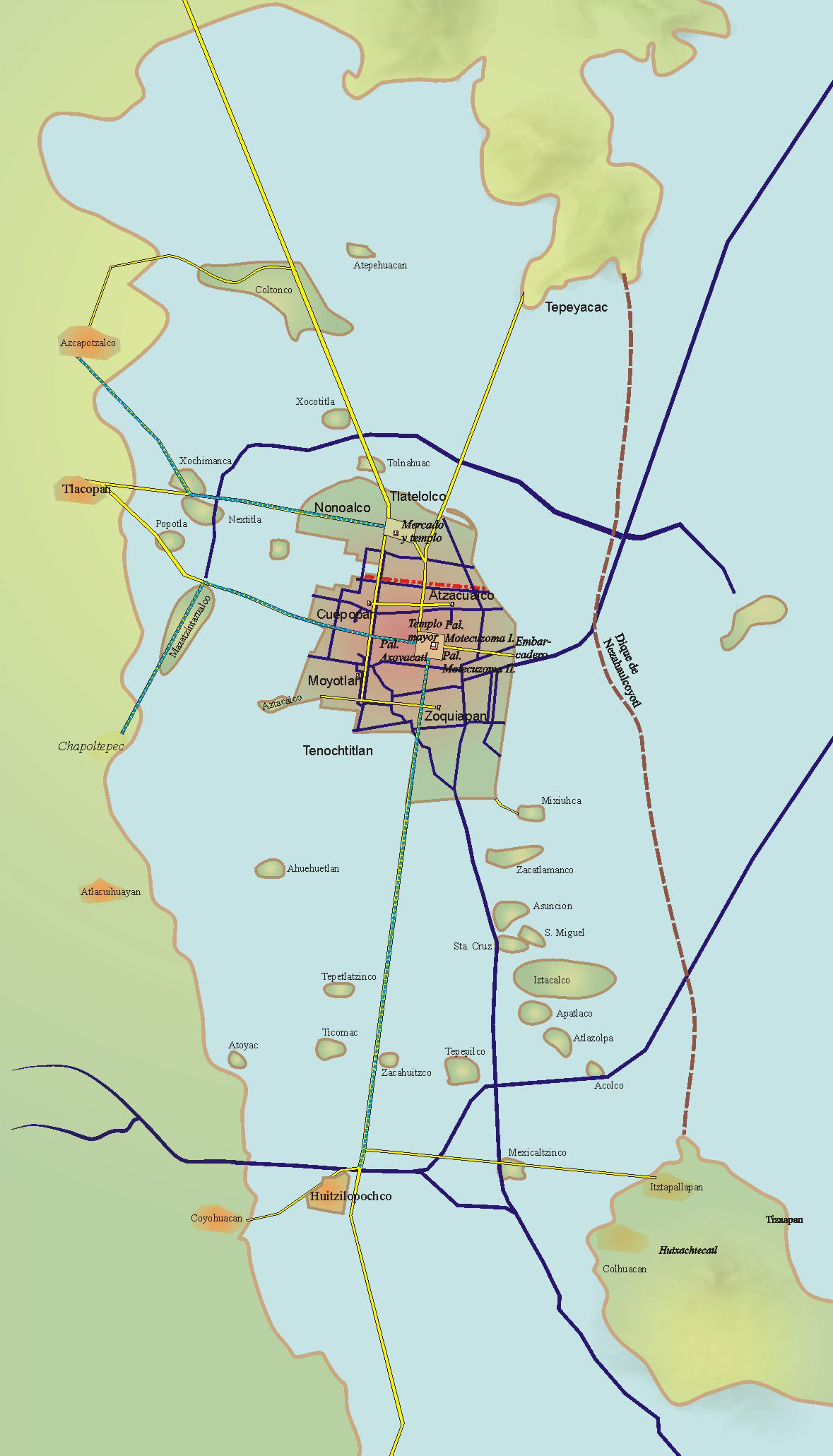
The western side of the shallow Lake Texcoco. Tenochtitlan is the southern part of the main island. The northern part is Tlatelolco.

Tenochtitlan covered an estimated 8 to 13.5 km^{2} (3.1 to 5.2 sq mi), situated on the western side of the shallow Lake Texcoco.

At the time of Spanish conquests, Mexico City comprised both Tenochtitlan and Tlatelolco. The city extended from north to south, from the north border of Tlatelolco to the swamps, which by that time were gradually disappearing to the west; the city ended more or less at the present location of Avenida Bucareli.

The city was connected to the mainland by bridges and causeways leading to the north, south, and west. The causeways were interrupted by bridges that allowed canoes and other water traffic to pass freely. The bridges could be pulled away, if necessary, to protect the city. The city was interlaced with a series of canals, so that all sections of the city could be visited either on foot or via canoe.

Lake Texcoco was the largest of five interconnected lakes. Since it formed in an endorheic basin, Lake Texcoco was brackish. During the reign of Moctezuma I, the "levee of Nezahualcoyotl" was constructed, reputedly designed by Nezahualcoyotl. Estimated to be 12 to 16 km (7.5 to 9.9 mi) in length, the levee was completed c. 1453. The levee kept fresh spring-fed water in the waters around Tenochtitlan and kept the brackish waters beyond the dike, to the east.

Two double aqueducts, each more than 4 km (2.5 mi) long and made of terracotta, provided the city with fresh water from the springs at Chapultepec. This was intended mainly for cleaning and washing. For drinking, water from mountain springs was preferred. Most of the population liked to bathe twice a day; Moctezuma was said to take four baths a day. According to the context of Aztec culture in literature, the soap that they most likely used was the root of a plant called copalxocotl (Saponaria americana), and to clean their clothes they used the root of metl (Agave americana). Also, the upper classes and pregnant women washed themselves in a temāzcalli, similar to a sauna bath, which is still used in the south of Mexico. This was also popular in other Mesoamerican cultures.

== City planning ==
When we saw so many cities and villages built in the water and other great towns on dry land we were amazed and said that it was like the enchantments (...) on account of the great towers and cues and buildings rising from the water, and all built of masonry. And some of our soldiers even asked whether the things that we saw were not a dream? (...) I do not know how to describe it, seeing things as we did that had never been heard of or seen before, not even dreamed about.

— Bernal Díaz del Castillo, The Conquest of New Spain

The city was divided into four zones, or camps; each camp was divided into 20 districts (calpullis, Nahuatl languages: calpōlli, pronounced [kaɬˈpoːlːi], meaning "large house"); and each calpulli, or 'big house', was crossed by streets or tlaxilcalli. There were three main streets that crossed the city, each leading to one of the three causeways to the mainland of Tepeyac, Iztapalapa, and Tlacopan. Bernal Díaz del Castillo reported that they were wide enough for ten horses. Surrounding the raised causeways were artificial floating gardens with canal waterways and gardens of plants, shrubs, and trees. The calpullis were divided by channels used for transportation, with wood bridges that were removed at night.

The earliest European images of the city were woodcuts published in Augsburg around 1522.

=== Marketplaces ===
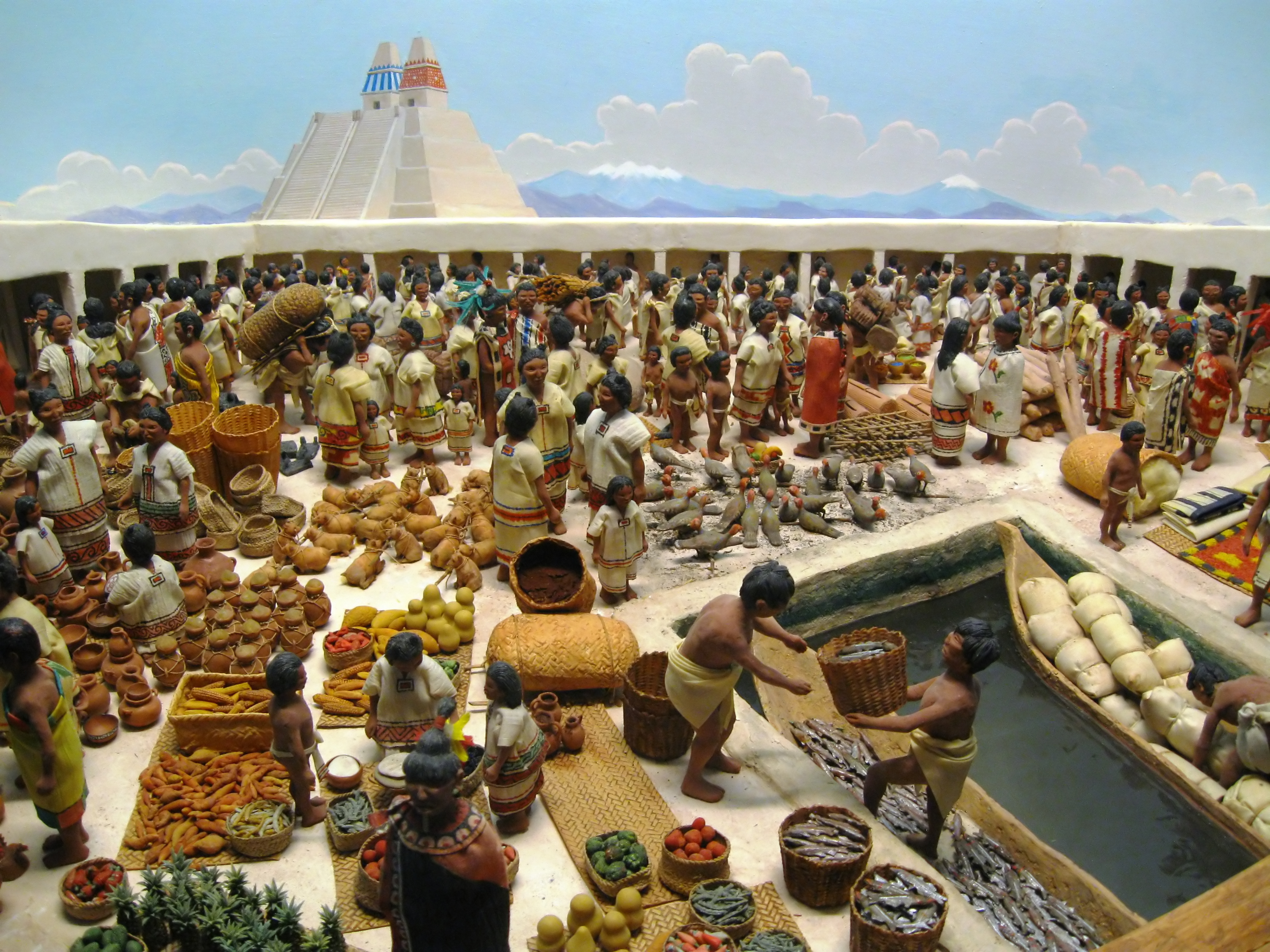
The Tlatelolco Marketplace as depicted at The Field Museum in Chicago.

Each calpulli had its own tiyanquiztli (marketplace), but there was also a main marketplace in Tlatelolco – Tenochtitlan's sister city. Spanish conquistador Hernán Cortés estimated it was twice the size of the city of Salamanca with about 60,000 people trading daily. Bernardino de Sahagún provides a more conservative population estimate of 20,000 on ordinary days and 40,000 on feast days. There were also specialized markets in the other central Mexican cities.

=== Public buildings ===
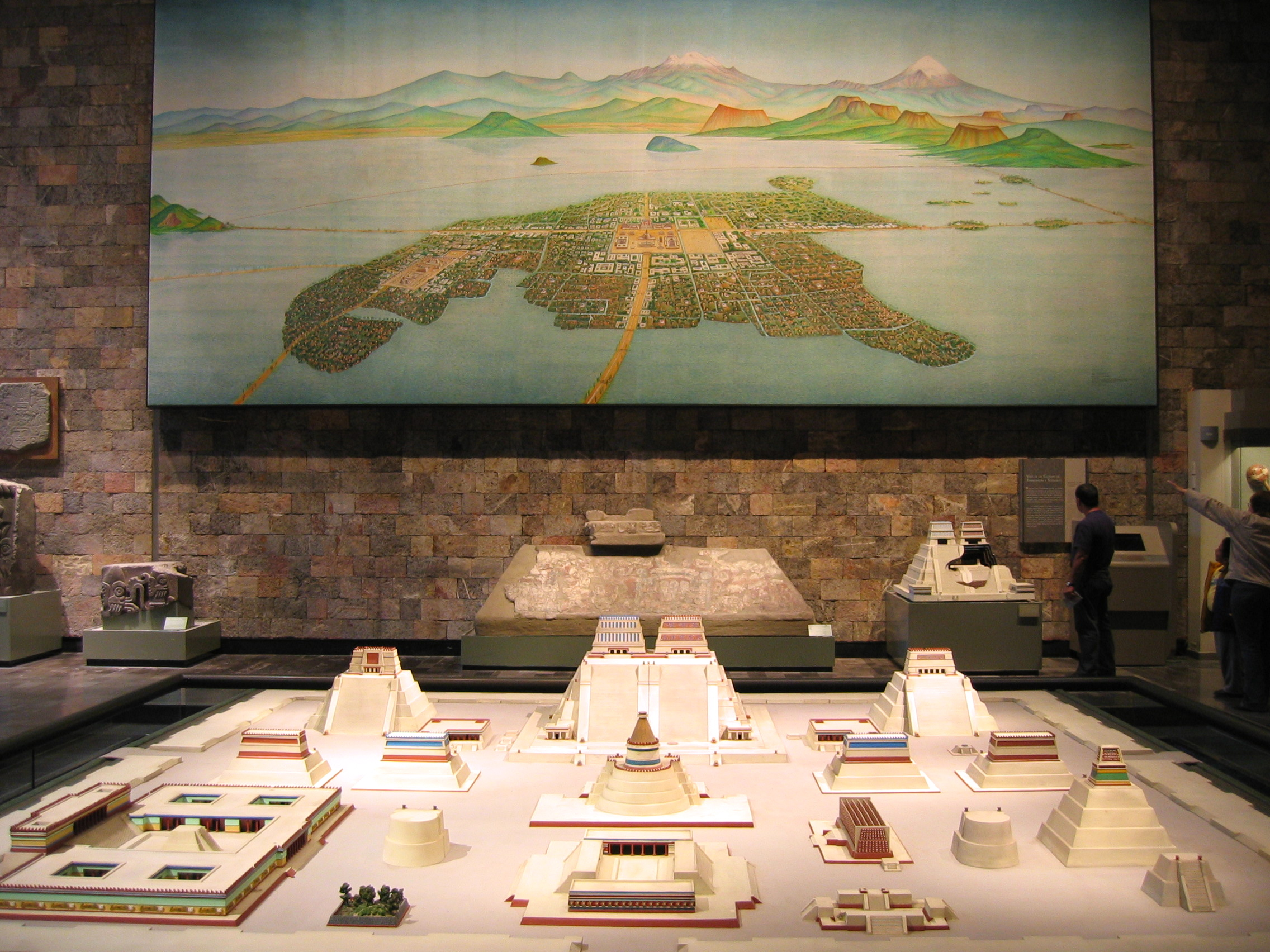
A picture of Tenochtitlan and a model of the Templo Mayor at the National Museum of Anthropology of Mexico City

In the center of the city were the public buildings, temples, and palaces. Inside a walled square, 500 meters (1,600 ft) to a side, was the ceremonial center. There were about 45 public buildings, including: the Templo Mayor, which was dedicated to the Aztec patron deity Huitzilopochtli and the Rain God Tlaloc; the temple of Quetzalcoatl; the tlachtli (ball game court) with the tzompantli or rack of skulls; the Sun Temple, which was dedicated to Tonatiuh; the Eagle's House, which was associated with warriors and the ancient power of rulers; the platforms for the gladiatorial sacrifice; and some minor temples.

Outside was the palace of Moctezuma with 100 rooms, each with its own bath, for the lords and ambassadors of allies and conquered people. Also located nearby was the cuicalli, or house of the songs, and the calmecac.

The city had great symmetry. All constructions had to be approved by the calmimilocatl, a functionary in charge of the city planning.

=== Palaces of Moctezuma II ===
The palace of Moctezuma II also had two houses or zoos, one for birds of prey and another for other birds, reptiles, and mammals. About 300 people were dedicated to the care of the animals.

There was also a botanical garden and an aquarium. The aquarium had ten ponds of salt water and ten ponds of fresh water, containing various fish and aquatic birds. Places like this also existed in Texcoco, Chapultepec, Huaxtepec (now called Oaxtepec), and Texcotzingo.

== Social classes ==
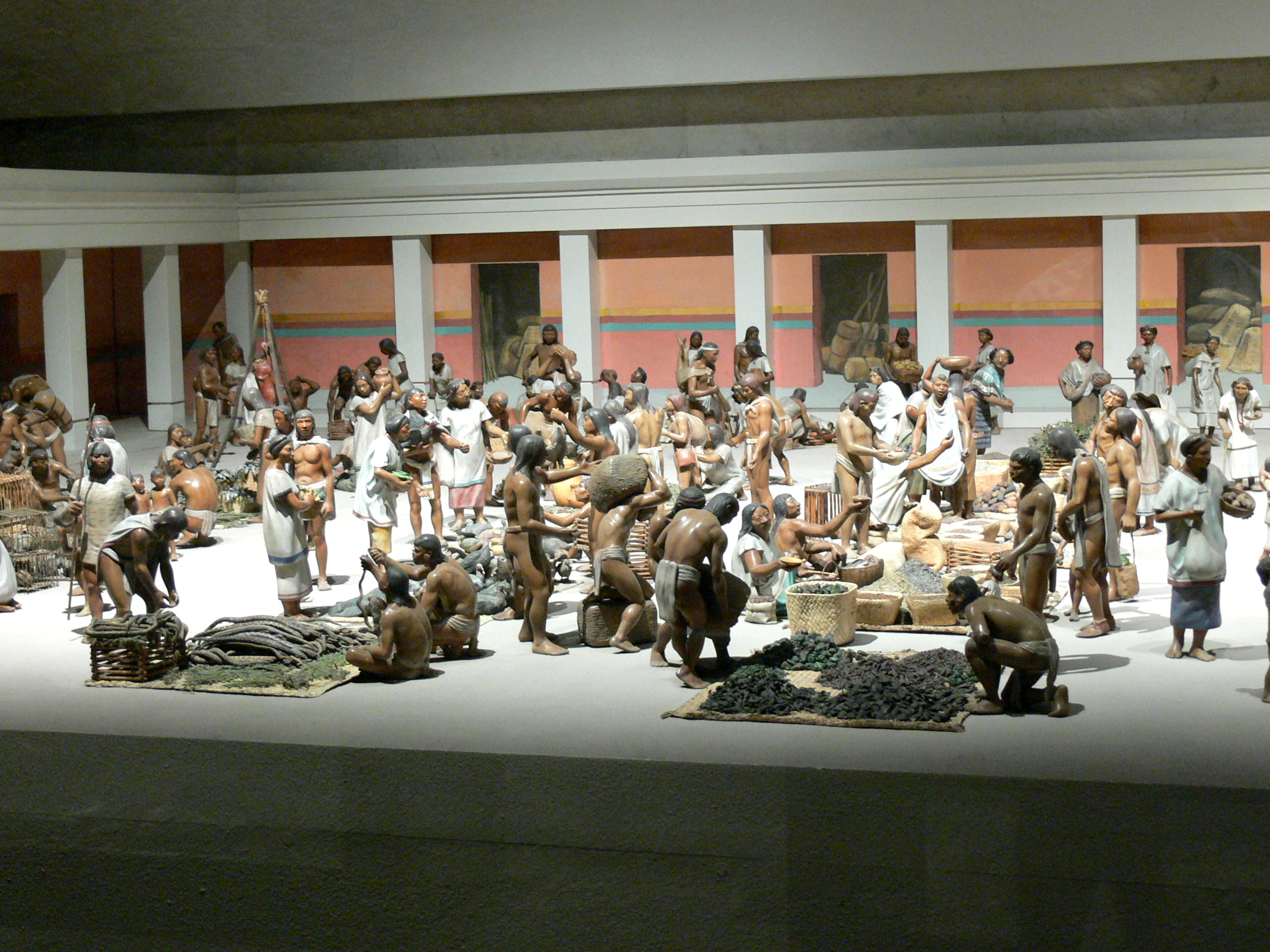
Reconstruction of an Aztec market in Tenochtitlan in the National Museum of Anthropology in Mexico City.

Tenochtitlan can be considered the most complex society in Mesoamerica in regard to social stratification. The complex system involved many social classes. The macehualtin were commoners who lived outside the island city of Tenochtitlan. The pipiltin were noblemen who were relatives of leaders and former leaders, and lived in the confines of the island. Cuauhipiltin, or eagle nobles, were commoners who impressed the nobles with their martial prowess, and were treated as nobles. Teteuctin were the highest class, rulers of various parts of the empire, including the king. Tlacohtin were slaves or indentured servants. Finally, the pochteca were merchants who traveled all of Mesoamerica trading. The membership of this class was based on heredity. Pochteca could become very rich because they did not pay taxes, but they had to sponsor the ritual feast of Xocotl Huetzi from the wealth that they obtained from their trade expeditions.

Status was displayed by the location and type of house where a person lived. Ordinary people lived in houses made of reeds plastered with mud and roofed with thatch. People who were better off had houses of adobe brick with flat roofs. The wealthy had houses of stone masonry with flat roofs. They most likely made up the house complexes that were arranged around the inner court. The higher officials in Tenochtitlan lived in the great palace complexes that made up the city.

Adding even more complexity to Aztec social stratification was the calpōlli. Calpōlli is a group of families related by either kinship or proximity. These groups consist of both elite members of Aztec society and commoners. Elites provided commoners with arable land and nonagricultural occupations, and commoners performed services for chiefs and gave tribute.

== History ==
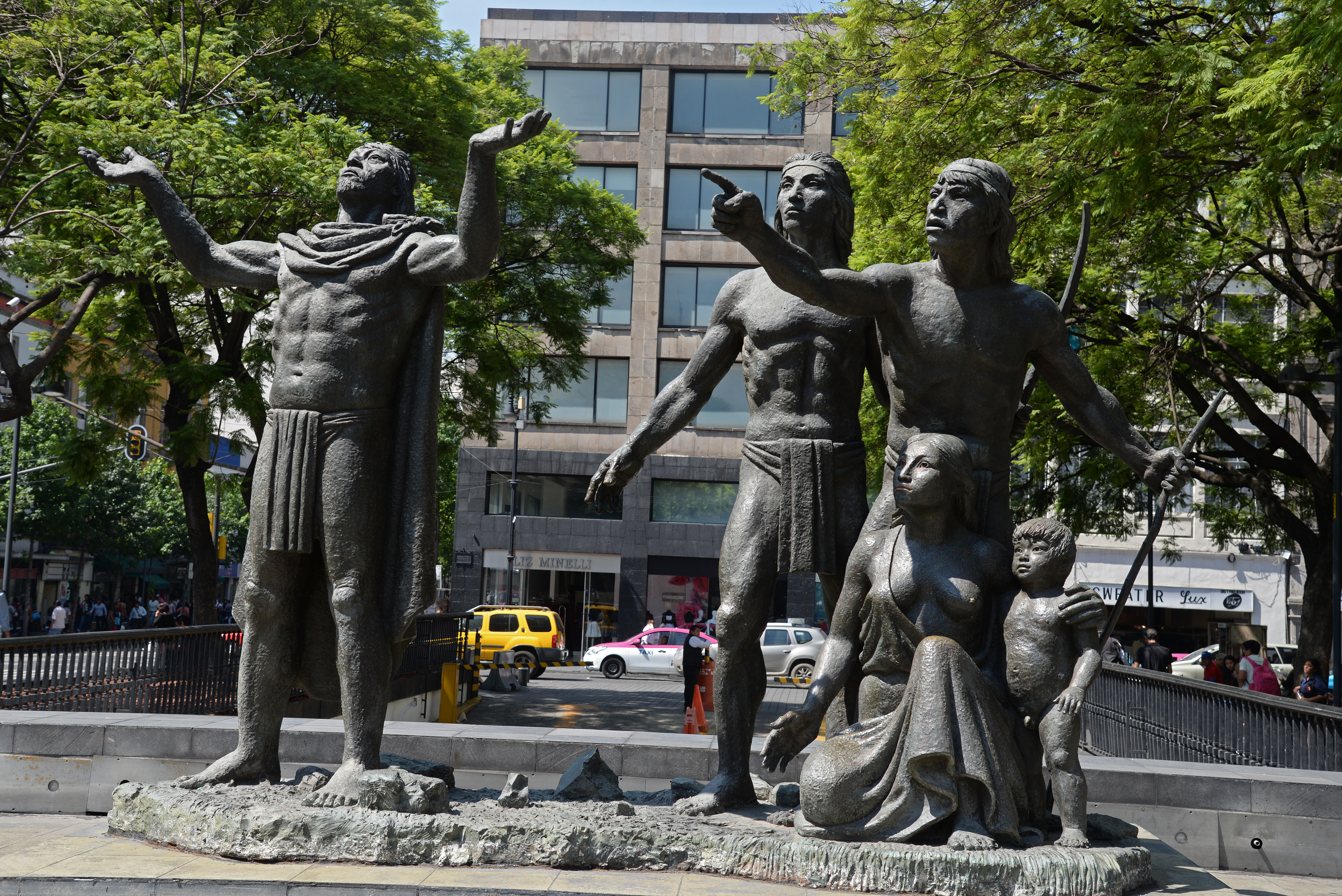
A Mexico City monument commemorating the founding of Tenochtitlan

Tenochtitlan was the capital of the Mexican civilization of the Mexica people, founded in 1325. The state religion of the Mexica civilization awaited the fulfillment of an ancient prophecy: the wandering tribes would find the destined site for a great city whose location would be signaled by an eagle with a snake in its beak perched atop a cactus (Opuntia), which had grown from the heart of Copil.

The Mexica saw this vision on what was then a small swampy island in Lake Texcoco, a vision that is now immortalized in Mexico's coat of arms and on the Mexican flag. Not deterred by the unfavourable terrain, they set about building their city, using the chinampa system (misnamed as "floating gardens") for agriculture and to dry and expand the island.

A thriving culture developed, and the Mexica civilization came to dominate other tribes around Mexico. The small natural island was perpetually enlarged as Tenochtitlan grew to become the largest and most powerful city in Mesoamerica. Commercial routes were developed that brought goods from places as far as the Gulf of Mexico, the Pacific Ocean and perhaps even the Inca Empire.

After a flood of Lake Texcoco, the city was rebuilt during the rule of Ahuitzotl, which was between 1486 and 1502, in a style that made it one of the grandest ever in Mesoamerica.

Hernan Cortés arrived in Tenochtitlan on 8 November 1519. Although there are no precise numbers, the city's population has been estimated at between 200,000 and 400,000 inhabitants, placing Tenochtitlan among the largest cities in the world at that time. Compared to the cities of Europe, only Paris, Venice and Constantinople might have rivaled it. It was five times the size of the London of Henry VIII. In a letter to the Spanish king, Cortés wrote that Tenochtitlan was as large as Seville or Córdoba. Cortés' men were in awe at the sight of the splendid city and many wondered if they were dreaming.

Although some popular sources put the number as high as 350,000 the most common estimates of the population are of over 200,000 people. One of the few comprehensive academic surveys of Mesoamerican city and town sizes arrived at a population of 212,500 living on 13.5 km^{2} (5.2 sq mi). It is also said that at one time, Moctezuma had rule over an empire of almost five million people in central and southern Mexico because he had extended his rule to surrounding territories to gain tribute and prisoners to sacrifice to the gods.

=== Conquest ===
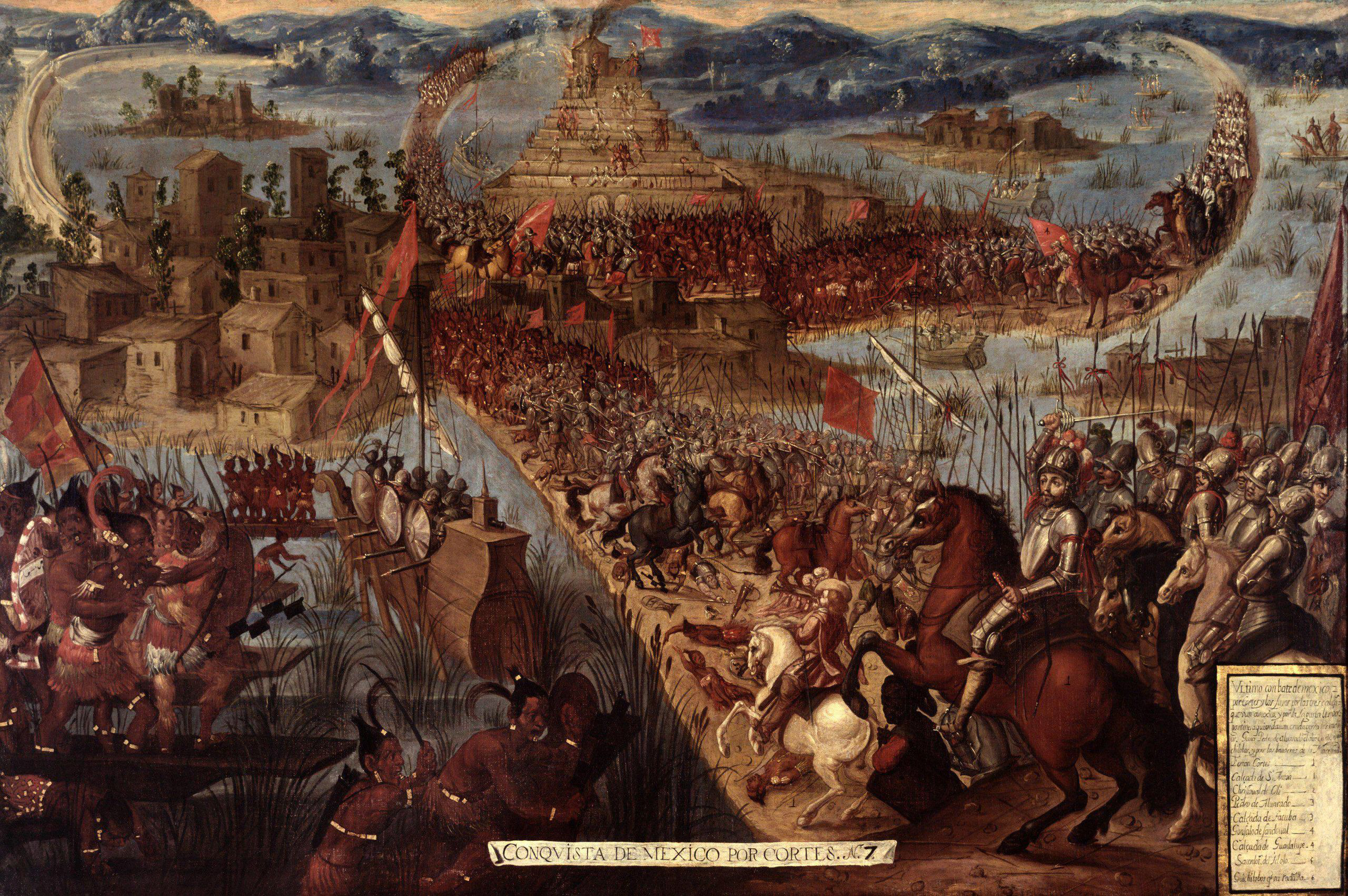
The Conquest of Tenochtitlan

Fall of Tenochtitlan
- Part of the Spanish conquest of the Aztec Empire and the Age of Discovery
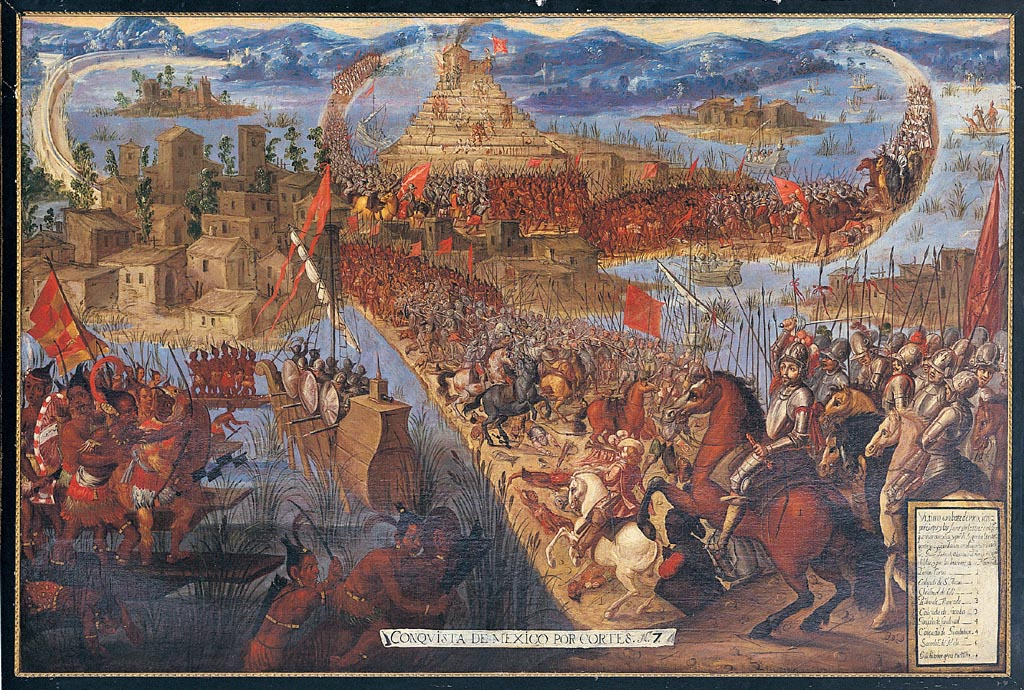
- A 17th-century painting depicting the Spanish-Tlaxcalan forces assaulting Tenochtitlan.
Date	May 22 – August 13, 1521 (2 months, 2 weeks and 5 days)
Location	Tenochtitlan, Valley of Mexico
Result	Decisive Spanish-Tlaxcalan victory: Destruction of Tenochtitlan; Collapse of the Aztec Empire; Establishment of New Spain

Belligerents
Kingdom of Castile: Tlaxcala; Texcoco; Totonacs; Other anti-Aztec indigenous allies	Aztec Empire: Tenochtitlan-Mexica; Tlatelolco

Commanders and leaders
Hernán Cortés; Pedro de Alvarado; Gonzalo de Sandoval; Cristóbal de Olid; Xicotencatl II; Ixtlilxochitl II	Cuauhtémoc (POW); Temilotzin; Tzilacatzin

Strength
Spanish forces: ~900–1,300 infantry & cavalry; 86 horses; 15–18 cannons; 13 brigantines (war galleys); Indigenous allies: 80,000–200,000 warriors	Aztec forces: ~50,000–100,000 warriors; Civilian population: ~200,000 (severely weakened by cocoliztli/smallpox)

Casualties and losses
Spanish: ~100–150 killed Indigenous allies: ~20,000+ killed	Aztecs: 100,000+ killed (combat and disease); Massive civilian fatalities due to starvation and epidemic

When Cortés and his men invaded Tenochtitlan, Moctezuma II chose to welcome Cortés as an ambassador rather than risk a war which might quickly be joined by aggrieved indigenous people.

As Cortés approached Tenochtitlan, the Tenochcah celebrated Toxcatl. At this event the most prominent warriors of each altepetl would dance in front of a huge statue of Huitzilopochtli. The Spanish leader, Pedro de Alvarado, who was left in charge, worried that the natives planned a surprise attack. He captured three natives and tortured them until they said that this was indeed planned to happen. During the festival, the Spaniards came heavily armed and closed off every exit from the courtyard so that no one would escape. This happened during their last days in Tenochtitlan.

Nobles lined each side of the city's main causeway, which extended about a league (4.83 km). Walking down the center came Moctezuma II, with two lords at his side, one his brother, the ruler of Iztapalapa. Cortés dismounted and was greeted by the ruler and his lords, but forbidden to touch him. Cortés gave him a necklace of crystals, placing it over his neck.

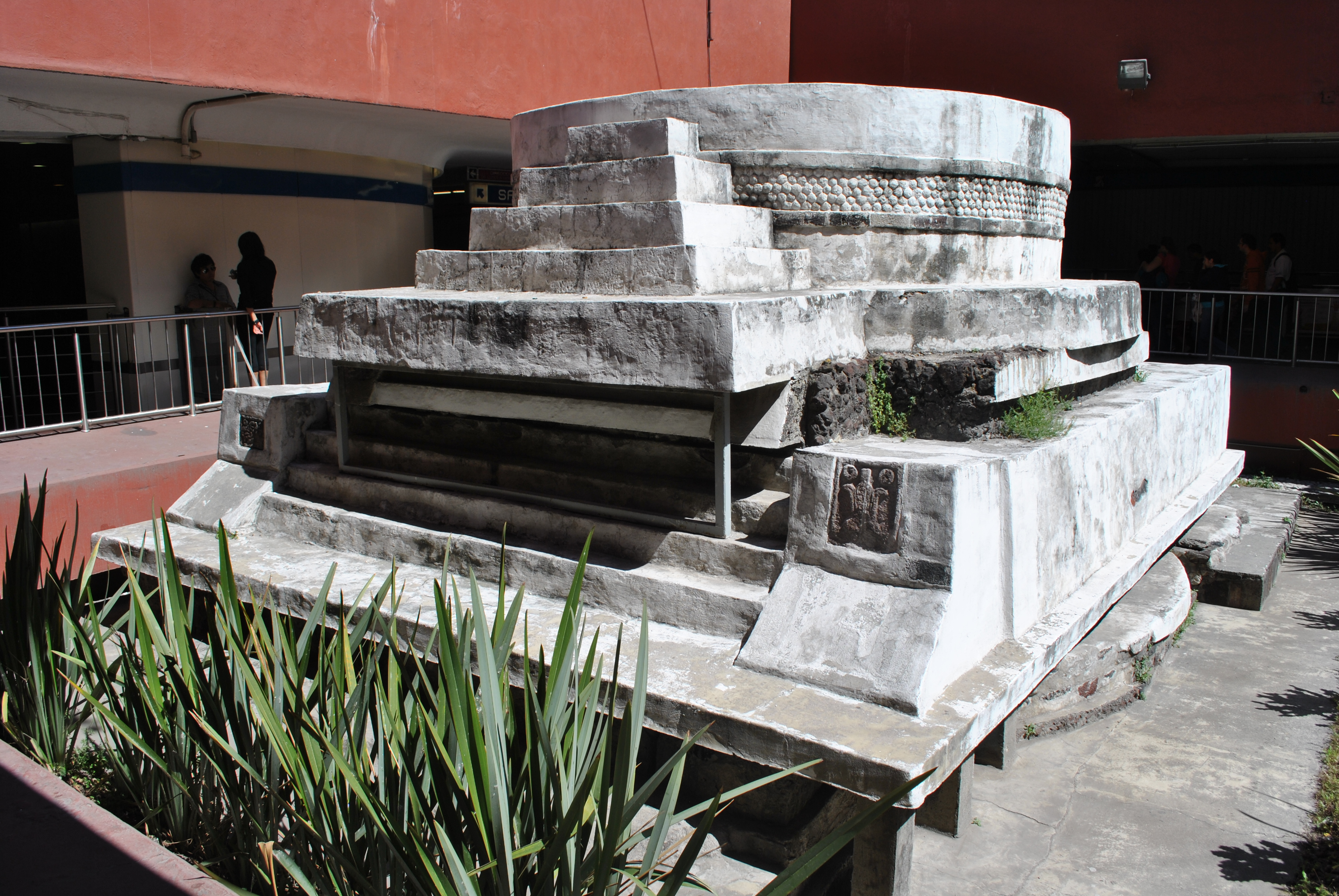
Mexica pyramid of Ehecatl in the Metro Pino Suárez station, Mexico City Subway.

They were then brought to a large house that would serve as their home for their stay in the city. Once they were settled, Moctezuma himself sat down and spoke with Cortés. The great ruler declared that anything that they needed would be theirs to have. He was thrilled to have visitors of such stature. Although the Spaniards were seeking gold, Moctezuma expressed that he had very little of the sort, but all of it was to be given to Cortés if he desired it.

Soon after arriving in Tenochtitlan, Cortés came up against problems. At Vera Cruz, the officer left in charge received a letter from Qualpopoca, the leader of Nueva Almería, asking to become a vassal of the Spaniards. He requested that officials be sent to him so that he could confirm his submission. To reach the province, the officers would have to travel through hostile land. The officer in charge of Vera Cruz decided to send four officers to meet with Qualpopoca.

When they arrived, they were captured and two were killed, the other two escaping through the woods. Upon their return to Vera Cruz, the officer in charge was infuriated, and led troops to storm Almería. Here they learned that Moctezuma was supposedly the one who ordered the officers executed. Back in Tenochtitlan, Cortés detained Moctezuma and questioned him. Though no serious conclusions were reached, this negatively affected the relationship between Moctezuma and the Spaniards.

Cortés subsequently besieged Tenochtitlan for over 90 days, causing a famine. Having gained control, he then directed the systematic destruction and leveling of the city; and began its rebuilding, despite opposition. The reconstruction involved the creation of a central area designated for Spanish use (the traza). The outer Indian section, now dubbed San Juan Tenochtitlan, continued to be governed by the previous indigenous elite and was divided into the same subdivisions as before.

The people of Tenochtitlan were soon exposed to diseases to which they had no immunity. Symptoms were often delayed for up to ten days, when the infection would spread throughout the body, causing sores, pain, and high fever. People were weak to the point that they could not move, nor obtain food and water. Burial of the dead became difficult to impossible, due to the pervasiveness of the people's illness. The people of Tenochtitlan began to starve and weaken. The death toll rose steadily over the course of the next 60 days.

=== Colonial era ===
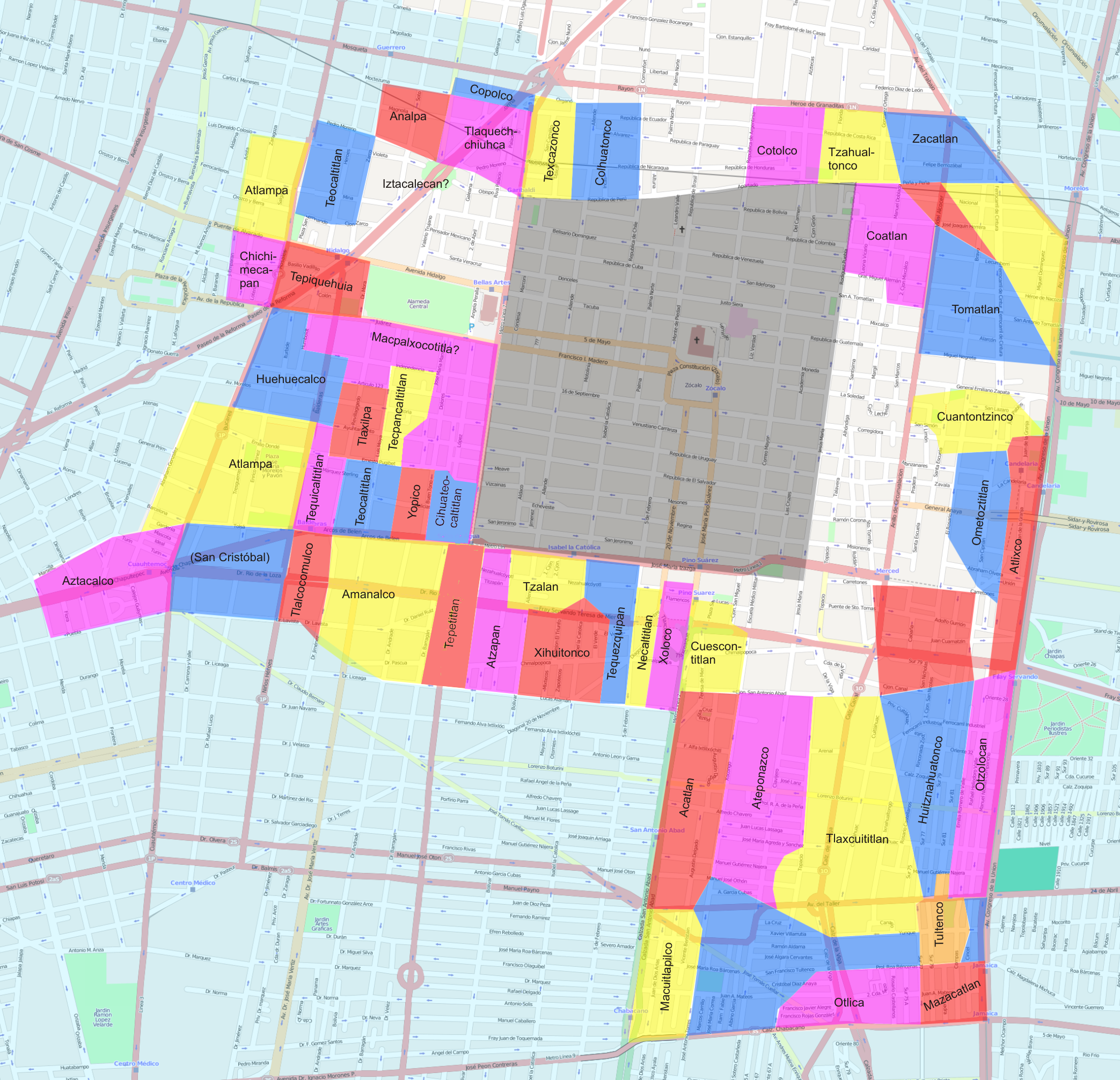
Districts of Tenochtitlan overlaid on a map of modern streets of Mexico City, with the traza shown in gray

Cortés founded the Spanish capital of Mexico City on the ruins of Tenochtitlan. Despite the extensive damage to the built environment, the site retained symbolic power and legitimacy as the capital of the Aztec empire, which Cortés sought to appropriate. For a time this ciudad de españoles, the highest rank in the Spanish hierarchy of settlement designation, was called Mexico–Tenochtitlan. Charles Gibson devotes the final chapter of his classic work, The Aztecs Under Spanish Rule, to what he called "The City", with later historians building on his work. The Spaniards established a cabildo or town council, which had jurisdiction over the Spanish residents. The Spanish established a Europeans-only zone in the center of the city, an area of 13 blocks in each direction of the central plaza, which was the traza. Although many native residents died during the siege of Tenochtitlan, the indigenous still had a strong presence in the city, and were settled in two main areas of the island, designated San Juan Tenochtitlan and Santiago Tlatelolco, each with a municipal council that functioned the entire colonial period. San Juan Tenochtitlan was a Spanish administrative creation, which amalgamated four indigenous sections, with each losing territory to the Spanish traza. The Spanish laid out the streets of the traza in a checker board pattern, with straight streets and plazas at intervals, whereas the indigenous portions of the city were irregular in layout and built of modest materials. In the colonial period both San Juan Tenochtitlan and Santiago Tlatelolco retained jurisdiction over settlements on the mainland that they could draw on for labor and tribute demanded by the Spanish, but increasingly those subordinate settlements (sujetos) were able to gain their autonomy with their own rulers and separate relationship with the Spanish rulers. Concern about the health of the indigenous population in early post-conquest Mexico–Tenochtitlan led to the founding of a royal hospital for indigenous residents.

There are a number of colonial-era pictorial manuscripts dealing with Tenochtitlan–Tlatelolco, which shed light on litigation between Spaniards and indigenous over property. An account with information about the war of Tenochtitlan against its neighbor Tlatelolco in 1473 and the Spanish conquest in 1521 is the Anales de Mexico y Tlatelolco, 1473, 1521–22. Anthropologist Susan Kellogg has studied colonial-era inheritance patterns of Nahuas in Mexico City, using Nahuatl- and Spanish-language testaments. On the 13th of August 1521, after over two months of fighting, Spanish conquistador Hernán Cortés succeeded in bringing about the fall of Tenochtitlan, the capital of the Aztec empire, and consequently brought an end to the Aztec empire.

=== Ruins ===
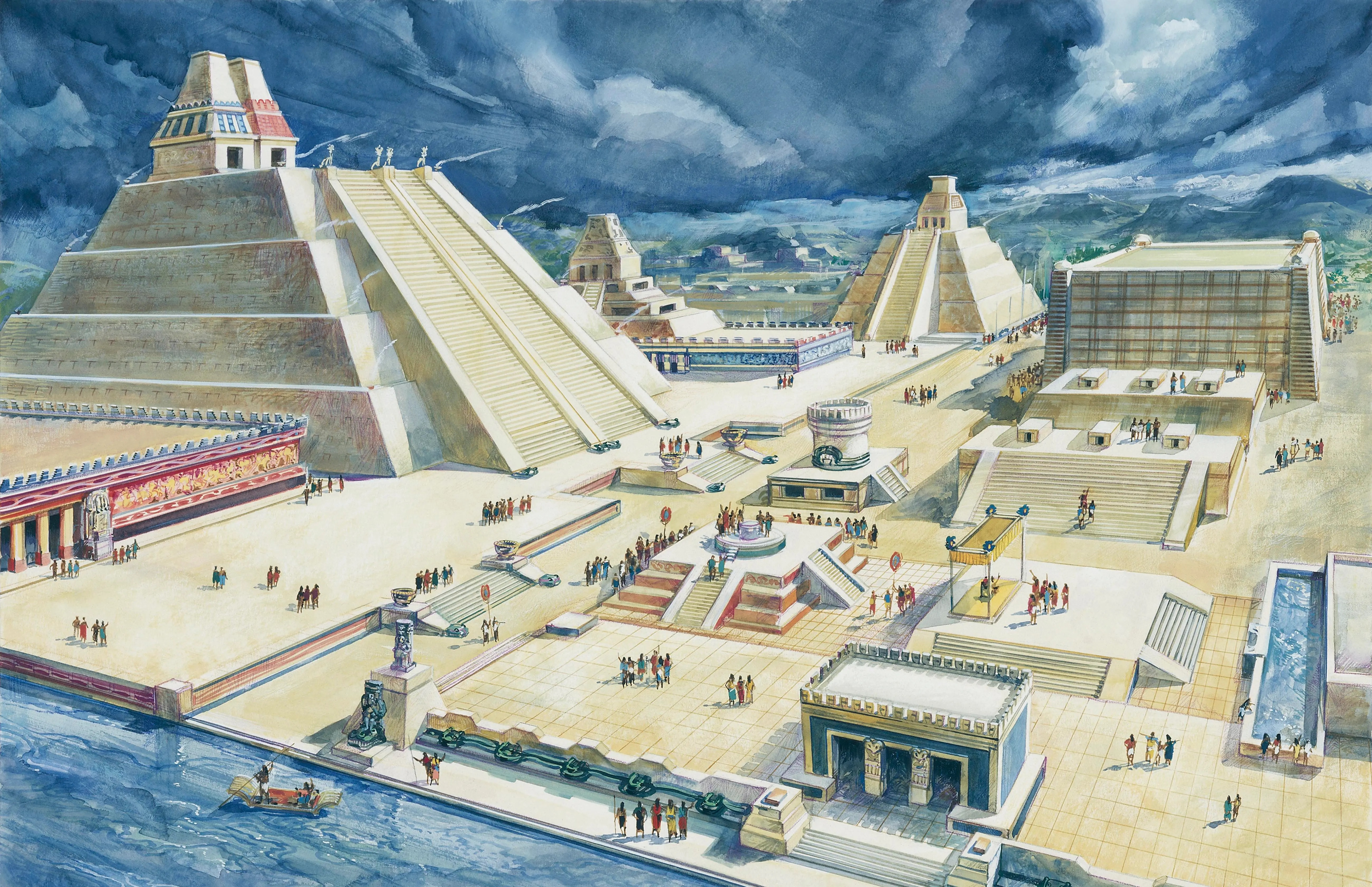
The Templo Mayor in Mexico-Tenochtitlan, the Aztec capital

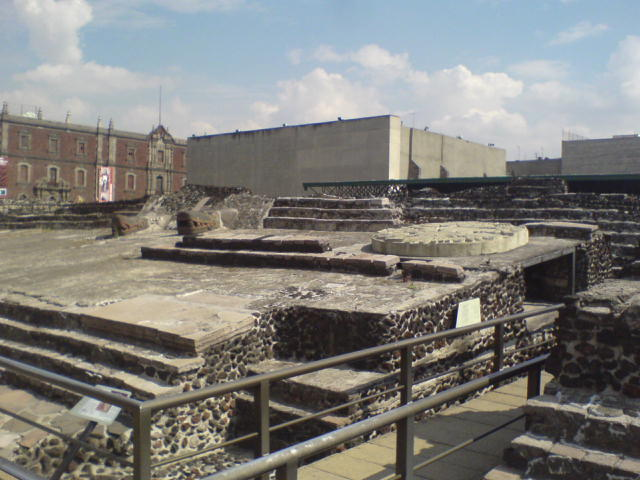
The ruins of the Templo Mayor

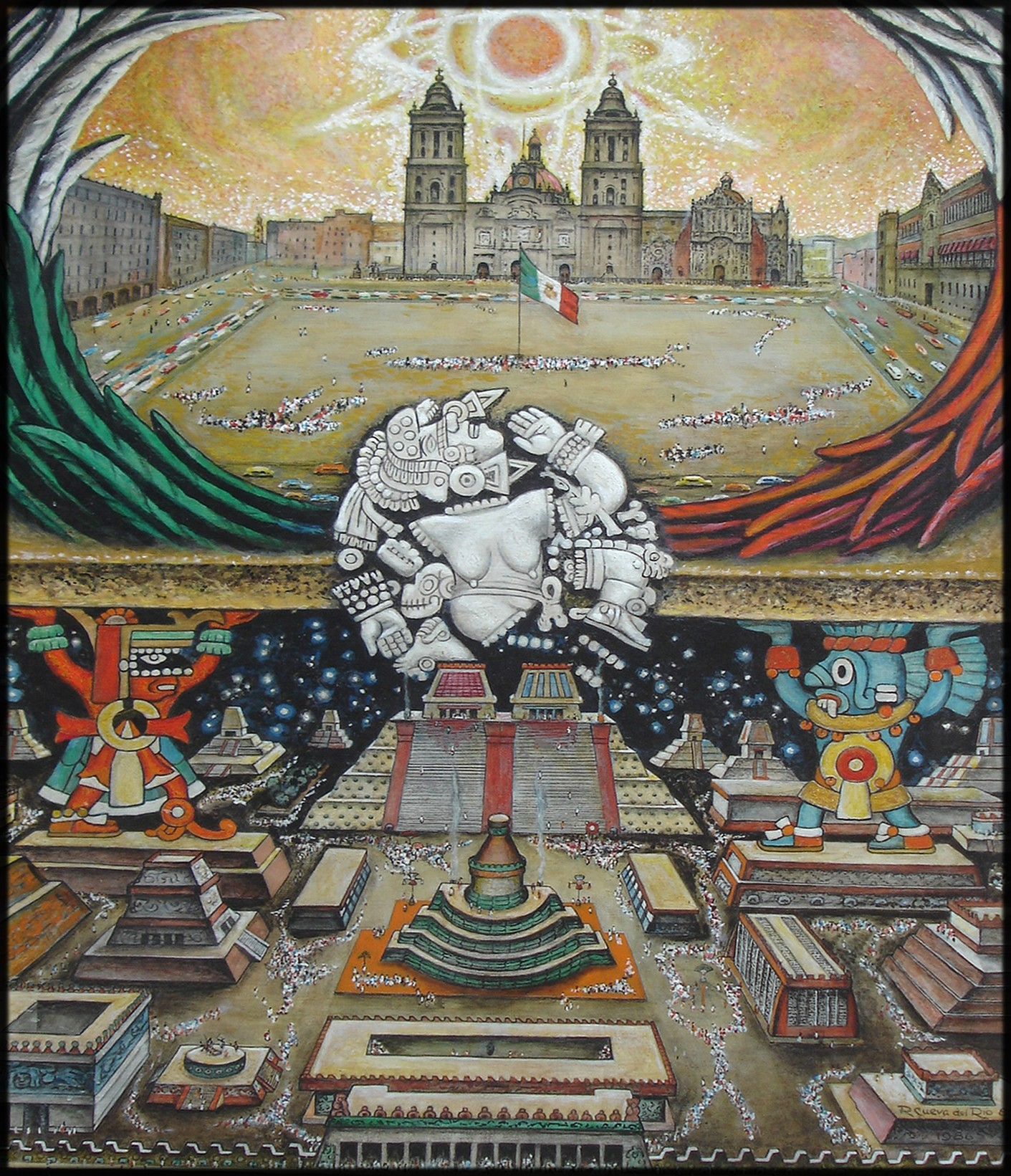
Fundación de México (The foundation of Mexico) – Tenochtitlán by Roberto Cueva del Río

Tenochtitlan's main temple complex, the Templo Mayor, was dismantled and the central district of the Spanish colonial city was constructed on top of it. The great temple was destroyed by the Spanish during the construction of a cathedral. The location of the Templo Mayor was rediscovered in the early 20th century, but major excavations did not take place until 1978–1982, after utility workers came across a massive stone disc depicting the nude dismembered body of the moon goddess Coyolxauhqui. The disc is 3.25 meters (10 ft 8 in) in diameter, and is held at the Templo Mayor Museum.

The ruins, constructed over seven periods, were built on top of each other. The resulting weight of the structures caused them to sink into the sediment of Lake Texcoco; the ruins now rest at an angle instead of horizontally.

Mexico City's Zócalo, the Plaza de la Constitución, is located at the site of Tenochtitlan's original central plaza and market, and many of the original calzadas still correspond to modern city streets. The Aztec calendar stone was located in the ruins. This stone is 4 meters (13 ft 1 in) in diameter and weighs over 18.1 metric tons (20 short tons; 17.9 long tons). It was once located half-way up the great pyramid. This sculpture was carved around 1470 under the rule of King Axayacatl, the predecessor of Tizoc, and is said to tell the history of the Mexicas and to prophesy the future.

In August 1987, archaeologists discovered a mix of 1,789 human bones five meters (16 ft 5 in) below street level in Mexico City. The burial dates back to the 1480s and lies at the foot of the main temple in the sacred ceremonial precinct of the Aztec capital. The bones are from children, teenagers and adults. A complete skeleton of a young woman was also found at the site.

== See also ==
- List of megalithic sites
- List of Mesoamerican pyramids
- History of Mexico City
- Portrait of Tenochtitlan

== Bibliography ==
- Coe, Michael D. (2008). Mexico: From the Olmecs to the Aztecs. New York, New York: Thames & Hudson.
- Cohen, Sara E. (March 1972). "How the Aztecs Appraised Montezuma". Society for History Education: The History Teacher. 5 (3): 21–30. doi:10.2307/491417. JSTOR 491417.
- Cortés, Hernán (1969). Five Letters of Cortés to the Emperor. Morris J.Baynard (ed. and trans.).
- Díaz del Castillo, Bernal (1963) [1632]. The Conquest of New Spain. Penguin Classics. J. M. Cohen (trans.) (sixth printing (1973) ed.). Harmondsworth, England: Penguin Books. ISBN 0-14-044123-9. OCLC 162351797.
- Smith, Michael E. (May 2005). "City Size in Late Post-Classic Mesoamerica" (PDF). Journal of Urban History. 31 (4). Beverly Hills, CA: SAGE Publications: 403–434. doi:10.1177/0096144204274396. OCLC 1798556. S2CID 145452272.
- Soustelle, Jacques (1984). La vida cotidiana de los aztecas en visperas de la conquista (in Spanish). Mexico City: Fondo de Cultura Economica.
- Stannard, David E. (1992). American Holocaust: Columbus and the conquest of the New World. New York, New York: Oxford University Press.
- Walker, Charles (1980). Wonders of the Ancient World. New York, New York: Crescent Books. ISBN 9780517318256.
- Townsend, Camilla. Malintzin's Choices: An Indian Woman in the Conquest of Mexico. Albuquerque: University of New Mexico Press, 2006. Print.
