= Tēlpochcalli =

Aztec youth education centers

Tēlpochcalli ([teːɬpot͡ʃˈkalːi], Nahuatl: house of the young men), were centers where Aztec youth were educated, from age 15, to serve their community and for war. These youth schools were located in each district or calpulli.

== Life in the telpochcalli ==
Life in the telpochcalli was tough. From early morning strenuous activities began. The day began with a cold bath, followed by a controlled and extremely frugal meal. They had to memorize the songs which they offered as praises of their gods and practiced in the use of weapons such as the sling, and the macuahuitl. Students had other obligations, such as carrying the necessary materials to repair the temples (teocalli), and collectively working the fields for their livelihood.

The Aztec world was characterized by the care the rulers put into the education system. Tenochtitlan schools were of two types, generally depending on the boys' social background: the sons of nobles attended the calmecac, an institution that was located within the ceremonial precinct, while the commoners known generically as macehualtin, and a few noble boys, attended the school for youths at the telpochcalli which were located in each neighborhood (calpulli).

== Informal training ==
Each family in Tenochtitlan regarded their children as a gift from the gods; children would continue the lineage, collaborate in the activities of the family and learn to respect their elders and venerate The Gods. Someday the family would celebrate their marriage, thus forming a new pillar in the social organization of the calpulli.

It was very important that within the family that children learn in the generation of the universe, carried out by the supreme gods, the male and female energies had been joined to enforce the creation of life. Women therefore educated their daughters, while men instructed their sons; that way through the process of informal education which had been imparted in the family, children learned the appropriate behaviors and different etiquettes for each sex.

From the age of three or four years, infants were to perform simple tasks with great restraint and obedience; as the years passed the work became more complex and with heavier tasks; that is how sons learned the crafts of their fathers, while girls learned the duties of their mothers, like cleaning the house, preparing food, spinning clothing for the family, etc.

Initially, children who rebelled were threatened with spanking, which became effective when they showed further disobedience; later, if young boys displayed negative attitudes, parents applied painful punctures with maguey thorns, or they would semi-asphyxyate them with the smoke from burning chillies (preparing them incidentally, for future practices of self-sacrifice). On the other hand, young ladies who showed negative attitudes, such as flirting and taste for gossip, were forced to sweep at night out of the house, which was seen as worse than a beating.

== See also ==
- Calmecac
- Aztec society
- Aztec warfare
