= Teuctocaitl =

A teuctocaitl, (Nahuatl for "lordly name"; pronounced [teːkʷtoːˈkaːitɬ]), was a special title usually ending in the word teuctli ("lord"). It was borne by Nahua tlatoani (rulers) in pre-Columbian central Mexico.

Each position of rulership had its own title associated with it, although a teuctocaitl could be borne by multiple rulers.

Tlatoani is the Nahuatl term for the ruler of an altepetl, a pre-Hispanic state.
