= Otompan =

Coordinates: 19°42′N 98°45′W

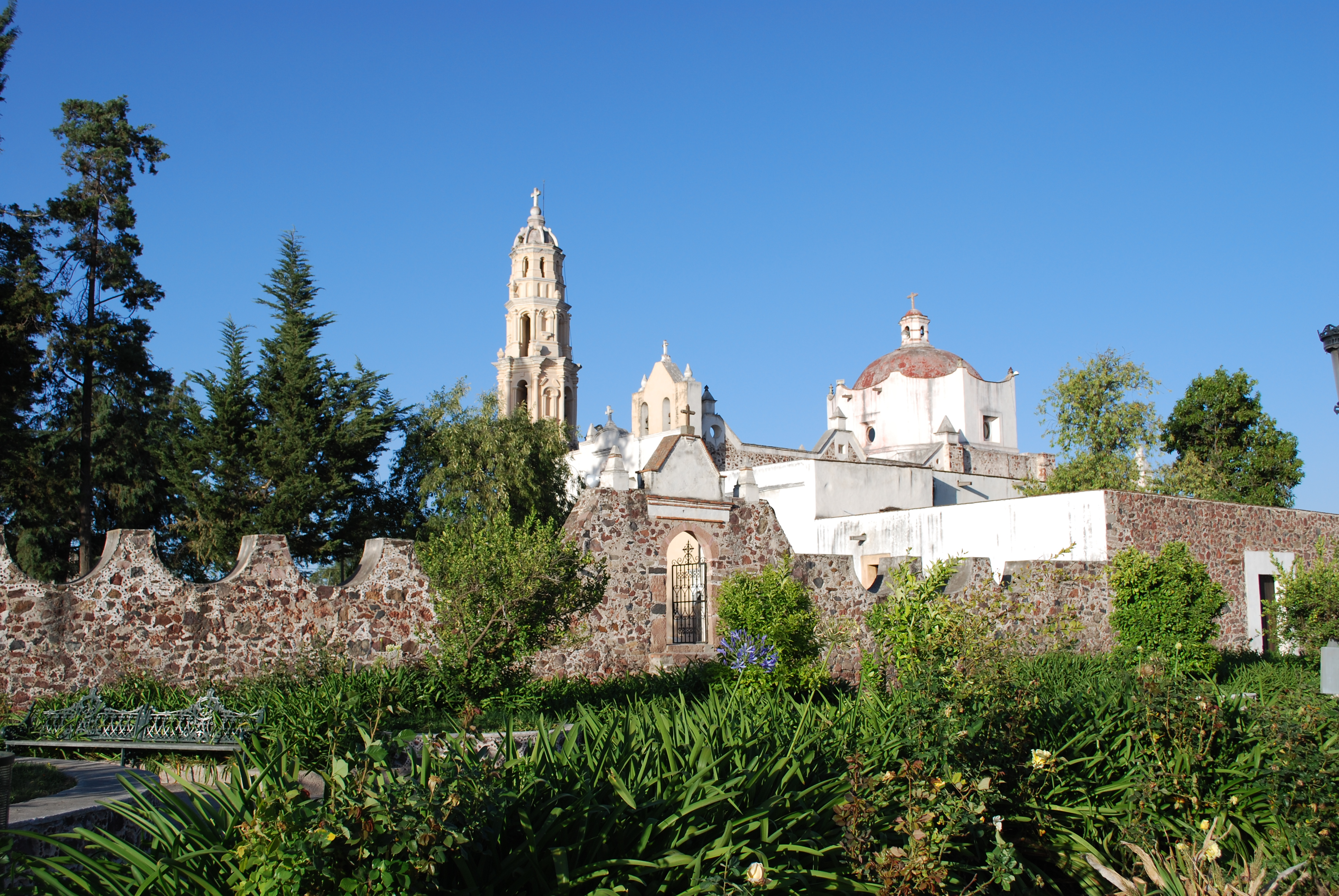
Side view of the church and ex monastery of Oxtotipac, Otumba, Mexico State

Otompan (Nahuatl for "place of Otomis") or Otumba (the Spanish version of the name) was a pre-Columbian altepetl or city-state in the upper Teotihuacan Valley (now in Mexico).

According to histories written in the colonial period (16th and 17th centuries), Otompan was created around 1395 when Techotlalatzin, ruler of Texcoco, settled Otomi refugees there who were fleeing the conquest of Xaltocan by the Tepanecs under Tezozomoc.

== See also ==
- Otumba de Gómez Farías
