= Pipiltin =

Noble social class in the Aztec Empire

The Pipiltin (sg. pilli) were the noble social class in the Mexica Empire. They are the lowest nobles in the civilization's social structure and above the commoners who achieved noble status due to an outstanding deed in war. These people were members of the hereditary nobility and occupied positions in the government as ambassadors and ministers, the army and the priesthood. Pipiltin often headed their own noble houses, called tecalli, with their own lands and dependent labourers. The subclasses within the Pipiltin were: tlahtohcapilli (a tlahtoani's son), tecpilli or teucpilli (a teuctli's son), tlazohpilli (son of a legitimate wife), and calpanpilli (son of a concubine).

Children of the Pipiltin were given extensive education in preparation for the role they would play in their adult life. They were sent to the calmecac, which was the center for higher learning, to study the ancient wisdom as well as "elegant forms of speech, ancient hymns, poems and historical accounts, religious doctrines, the calendar, astronomy, astrology, legal precepts and the art of the government."

== Origin ==
As the Aztecs began settling what would later become their homelands, an elite emerged (the Pipiltin) that claimed descent from the Toltecs, the former empire of Central Mexico. The new hereditary elite unified the clans that had been the center of Aztec life and paved the way for a conquest empire. Some sources describe the Pipiltin as the offspring of tlahtohqueh and teteuctin, which were different social classes within the ruling nobility.

The authority and prestige of the Pipiltin were based on the belief that they descended from the original migrant founders of the Aztecs and came from a mythical place. Due to this heritage, they enjoyed privileges such as special family dispensation, the use of privilege goods and dwellings that were appropriate to their station.

The social class Pipiltin is also a possible etymology for the exonym of the Pipil people of western El Salvador, given to the Nahua people of Kuskatan by the invading Spanish's Tlaxcala and Mexica auxiliaries.

== See also ==
- Macehualtin, the commoners
