= Michael E. Smith (archaeologist) =

American archaeologist

Michael Ernest Smith (born 1953) is an American archaeologist working primarily with Aztec and general Mesoamerican archaeology. He has written numerous scholarly articles about central Mexican archaeology as well as several books about the Aztecs, among them a widely used textbook (Smith 2003). He is currently Professor of Anthropology in the School of Human Evolution and Social Change at Arizona State University. He is known for stressing the importance of assessing archaeological evidence independently of the ethnohistorical sources, and advocating its use as a source of knowledge about the Aztecs.

== Published works ==
Smith's publications include:

- Smith, Michael E. (1984). "The Aztlan Migrations of Nahuatl Chronicles: History or Myth?" (PDF Reprint). Ethnohistory. 31 (3). Durham, NC: Duke University Press, American Society for Ethnohistory: 153–186. doi:10.2307/482619. JSTOR 482619. OCLC 145142543.
- The Aztecs (2nd ed.). Malden, MA: Blackwell Publishers. 2003. ISBN 0-631-23015-7. OCLC 48579073.
- Smith, M. E. (May 2005). "City Size in Late Post-Classic Mesoamerica" (PDF). Journal of Urban History. 31 (4). Beverley Hills, CA: Sage Publications: 403–434. doi:10.1177/0096144204274396. OCLC 1798556. S2CID 145452272.
