= Macehualtin =

Commoner social class in Aztec society

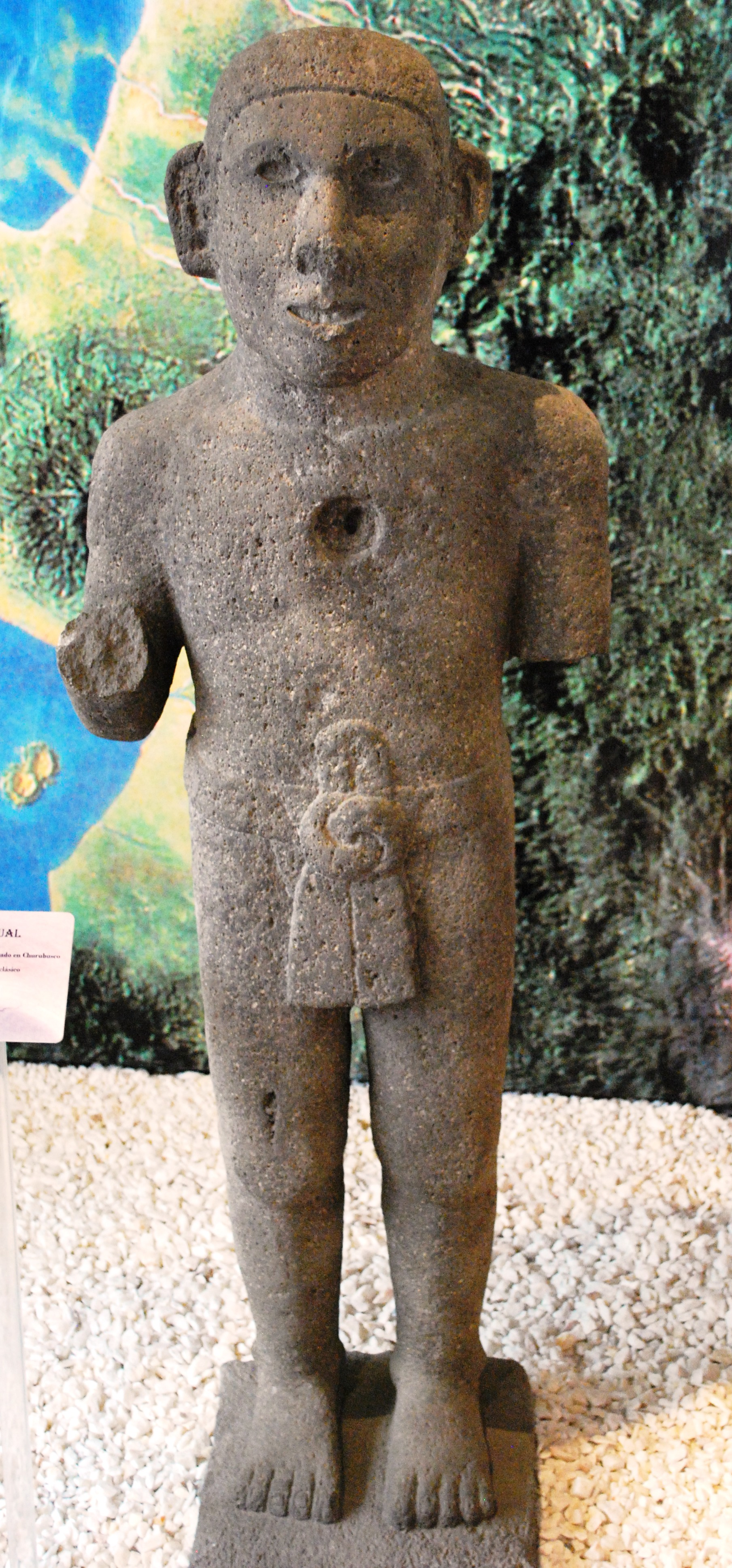
Stone figure of Macehual uncovered at the Museo Nacional de las Intervenciones (ex Monastery of Churubusco) in Coyoacan borough, Mexico City.

The mācēhualtin (IPA: [maːseːˈwaɬˈtin], singular mācēhualli [maːseːˈwalːi]) were the commoner social class in Aztec society.

The Aztec social class of the mācēhualtin were rural farmers, forming the majority of the commoners in the Aztec Empire. The mācēhualtin worked lands that belonged to the social unit of the calpolli called chinampas, with each family maintaining rights to the land so long as it did not lie fallow for more than two years. Within these lands, the rural mācēhualtin constructed small dams and terraces to increase their agricultural yield. Crops common to Mexican agriculture were grown on these plots, including maize, beans and squash. These projects were probably organized by the local communities and were not state led. From their produce and productivity, the corn were required to pay tribute to the Aztec nobility.

During the reign of Moctezuma II (1502–1520), they were banned from serving in the royal palaces, as this monarch widened the divide between pipiltin (nobles) and macehualtin. However, before his reign it was noted that there was some mobility, though uncommon, within the social classes. Those who moved up (through military deeds) and became pipiltin were called yāōtequihuah. Those who were brought down ranks in spite of birth status as pipiltin were called pillaquīztīltin (from pilli, noble and tlaquīzcāyōtl, the end of something). Macehualtin could also become or sell their children into slavery.

This possibility for social mobility was relatively uncommon due to the locative view of the world held by the Aztecs. This point of view emphasized the idea that everyone and everything had a correct place in the world. It was almost a moral imperative to find one's place and conform to its requirements. This logic extended to social class, with the pipiltin being viewed as having trained to rule the rest of society, specifically made by the Aztec gods for this purpose, and the macehualtin being viewed as having been made to work for the benefit of society. Rituals, teachings, and many other aspects of Aztec society helped to reinforce this worldview. Inequality among the social classes was further reinforced by societal institutions such as a differential set of laws for the commoners and those of the upper class. This differential set of laws was harsher towards the nobility than towards the commoners for a comparable offense.

As Aztec society was in part centered on warfare, every Aztec male received some sort of basic military training from an early age. Typically by the time the child reached three years of age, the boy would begin to take simple instruction at the hands of his father on the tasks expected of men, no matter what social class they fell into. The only extremely slim possibility of possible upwards social mobility for mācēhualtin was through military achievement. The taking of captives (māltin [ˈmaːltin], singular mālli) marked an important transition into status as a full warrior, was the way for soldiers to move up the social ladder, and it continued to be a source of honor throughout a man's tenure as a warrior. Failure to take captives or perform well in battle later in life would be a source of dishonor for the warriors. While this would negatively impact warriors who were mācēhualtin, it would be a worse social blow for members of the nobility, although not as materially damaging.

The mācēhualtin children attended the telpochcalli or "House of Youths" beginning at fifteen years of age. This was a school for both boys and girls, but the girls and boys learned separately. In the telpochcalli, the young men learned martial arts and other aspects of Aztec warfare. They spent a great deal of time engaged in physical labor around the school and around the community in order to build the young men's strength. Some activities such as hauling firewood eventually took the form of a test of physical prowess as larger and larger loads of firewood were given to the young men; such youths would have to face greater burdens when they took to the battlefield. While the young men prepared to become warriors for the Aztec Empire, the young Aztec women attended the cuicalco or "House of Song", a subdivision of the telpochcalli. Here they learned ritual arts like dance and song.

Divisions based on gender prominently affected children among the mācēhualtin. An emphasis on gender divisions began at birth, not just with schooling. Some early rituals differed between newborn boys and newborn girls. For the male children, symbolic actions like giving the umbilical cord to warriors to bury in fields where battles might take place emphasized their role as future warriors. For the female children, symbolic actions like burying the umbilical cord near the hearth emphasized the female role in the home.

After the Spanish conquest, the Nahuatl word mācēhualli was adopted in colonial Spanish as macehual, and was used all over New Spain as a synonym for "commoner", "subject", and "native".

== See also ==
- Pipiltin, the nobility of the Aztec Empire

== Bibliography ==
- Carrasco, David; Sessions, Scott (2011). Daily life of the Aztecs (2nd ed.). Santa Barbara: Greenwood. ISBN 978-0-313-37744-0.
- Clendinnen, Inga (1992). Aztecs : an interpretation (Repr. ed.). Cambridge [u.a.]: Cambridge Univ. Pr. ISBN 0-521-40093-7.
- Coe, Michael D.; Koontz, Rex (2013). Mexico: From the Olmecs to the Aztecs (7th ed.). New York, NY: Thames & Hudson Inc. pp. 203–204, 206. ISBN 978-0-500-29076-7.
- Fargher, Lane F.; Blanton, Richard E.; Heredia Espinoza, Verenice Y. (September 2010). "Egalitarian Ideology and Political Power in PreHispanic Central Mexico: The Case Of Tlaxcallan". Latin American Antiquity. 21 (3): 227–251. doi:10.7183/1045-6635.21.3.227. JSTOR 25766992. S2CID 156460552.
- Hassig, Ross (1988). Aztec Warfare: Imperial Expansion and Political Control. Civilization of the American Indian series, no. 188. Norman: University of Oklahoma Press. ISBN 0-8061-2121-1. OCLC 17106411.
- Hassig, Ross (1992). War and Society in Ancient Mesoamerica. Berkeley: University of California Press. ISBN 0-520-07734-2. OCLC 25007991.
- Restall, Matthew (1997). The Maya World: Yucatec Culture and Society, 1550-1850. Stanford: Stanford University Press. ISBN 9780804736589.
