= Calpulli =

Aztec units of commoner housing

In pre-Columbian Aztec society, calpulli (from Classical Nahuatl calpōlli, Nahuatl pronunciation: [kaɬˈpoːlːi], meaning "large houses", singular calpul) were units of commoner housing that had been split into kin-based or other land holding groups within Nahua city-states or altepetls. In Spanish sources, calpulli are termed parcialidades or barrios. The inhabitants of a calpul were collectively responsible for different organizational and religious tasks in relation to the larger altepetl. A calpul could be created based on an extended family, being part of a similar ethnic or national background, or having similar skills and tribute demands. The misunderstanding that calpulli were family units can be blamed on the fact that the word "family" refers to blood relations in English, while in Nahuatl it refers to the people whom you live with.

The primary functions of the calpulli were to coordinate land use for growing crops, food production, and manufacturing tribute. Tribute was owed by each tributary unity, typically determined as a group of course and co-residents. Tribute was paid in goods or in labor based on lists of tributaries. The most typical forms of agriculture in Aztec society were chinampas and check dam terrace farming. Chinampas' effective built-in drainage systems allowed for the flow of water and sediment, which was then stored as mud and used for fertilizer.

Tribute was a large part of Aztec society and supported the nobility. Tributes were expected from commoners around four times a year, the most common item being cotton textiles. Calpulli were also places for education. Women were taught to cook, sew, care for children, and work with textiles. The calpul also operated as the Tēlpochcalli schools for young men to learn to be warriors. Aztec warfare was extremely important and men were expected to go to battle beginning at the age of 15. Aztec warfare was organized so that men would go to fight for their calpul, so they were fighting for their familial pride.

A comparable concept of lineage groups in the Highland Maya societies of Guatemala was the chinamit.

== See also ==
- Ejido
- Georgism
- Land value tax
- Community land trust
