= Altepetl =

City-states in Pre-Columbian Mesoamerica

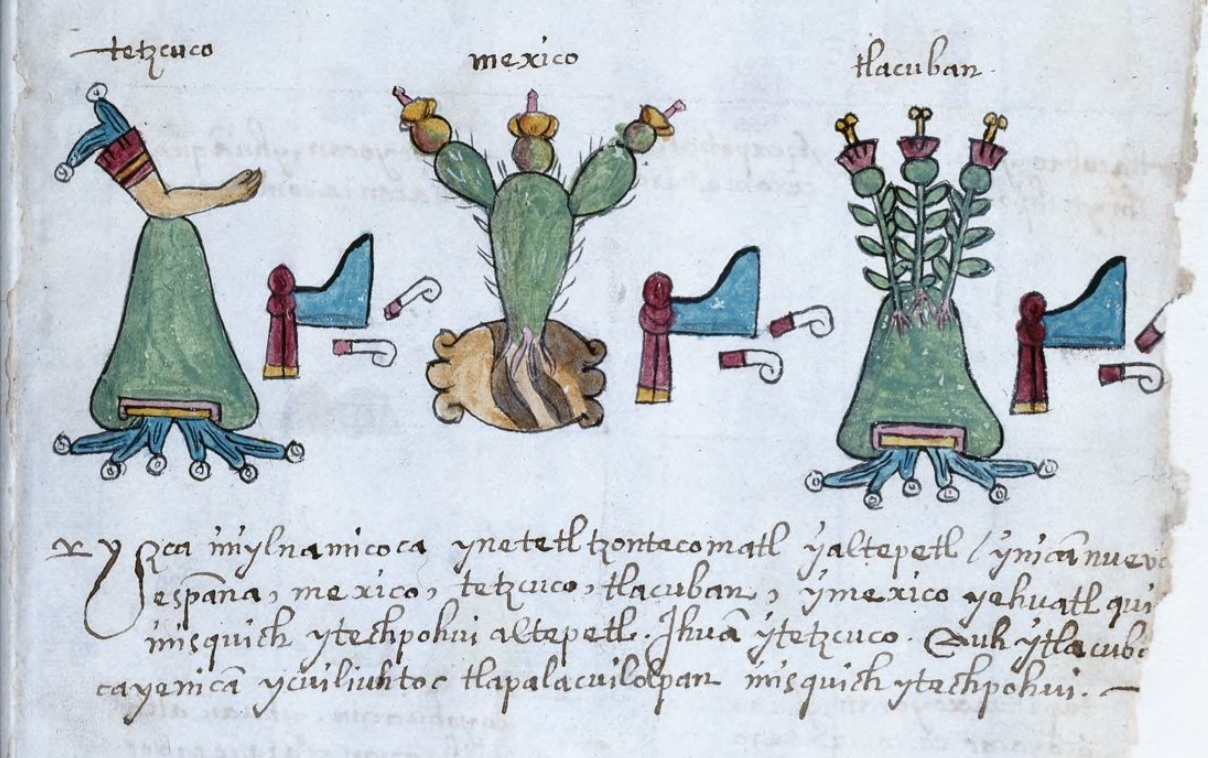
Glyphs representing Texcoco, Tenochtitlan, and Tlacopan, the three primary altepetl of the Aztec Empire.

The altepetl (Classical Nahuatl: āltepētl [aːɬ.ˈte.peːt͡ɬ], plural altepeme or altepemeh [aːɬ.ˈte.ˈpeːme(h)]) was the local, ethnically-based political entity, usually translated into English as "city-state", of pre-Columbian Nahuatl-speaking societies in the Americas. The altepetl was composed of smaller units known as calpolli and was typically led by a single dynastic ruler known as a tlatoani, although examples of shared rule between up to five rulers are known. Each altepetl had its own jurisdiction, origin story, and served as the center of Indigenous identity. Residents referred to themselves by the name of their altepetl rather than, for instance, as "Mexicas". "Altepetl" was a polyvalent term rooting the social and political order in the creative powers of a sacred mountain that contained the ancestors, seeds and life-giving forces of the community. The word is a combination of the Nahuatl words ātl (meaning "water") and tepētl (meaning "mountain"). A characteristic Nahua mode was to imagine the totality of the people of a region or of the world as a collection of altepetl units and to speak of them on those terms. The concept is comparable to Maya cah and Mixtec ñuu. Altepeme formed a vast complex network which predated and outlasted larger empires, such as the Aztec and Tarascan state.

Established altepeme were characterized by a central temple dedicated to a patron god particular to the identity of the altepetl and a central market. Altepeme were typically multiethnic and communal cohesion was often maintained through territorial exclusiveness.

== Mesoamerican politics ==
Local rulers of altepeme generally retained their authority over taxation and land distribution while under the indirect rule of an empire in exchange for their submission, participation in military campaigns, and tribute payments. However, starting with Moctezuma Ilhuicamina I in the 1440s, Aztec imperialist efforts over the altepetl deepened by removing the powers of taxation from local rulers and replacing non-compliant rulers with military governors. These heightened pressures produced unstable conditions in Mesoamerica in which altepetl frequently rebelled by withholding tributes and pursuing secession. Cuauhnahuac, a major altepetl of the southern Aztec empire, rebelled on three occasions. The Aztecs responded with intense violence, which only fueled more violence in response.

At the time of Spanish invasion in 1519, the Aztec Empire alone consisted of approximately 450 altepeme. The Spanish recognized and exploited the preexisting political divisions among the various altepeme and the Aztecs, inciting dissident city-states to rebel. No "super-altepetl" identity existed to unite against the Spanish. The Totonacs of Cempoala were among the first to ally with the Spanish, having only recently been brought under Aztec control after many years of resistance. The Tlaxcaltec of Tlaxcala initially resisted the Spanish but soon joined the conquest effort as a crucial ally against the Aztec Empire. After the fall of Tenōchtitlan in 1521, the Spanish increasingly demanded that altepetl rulers publicly destroy their figures of deities (referred to as idols by the Spanish) and whitewash temple walls. While destroying idols had represented a transfer of sovereignty and tributes to the conquering power in Mesoamerican politics, with the invasion of the Spanish, Indigenous peoples soon realized "that in the Spanish context it implied a far more sweeping, cosmic transformation."

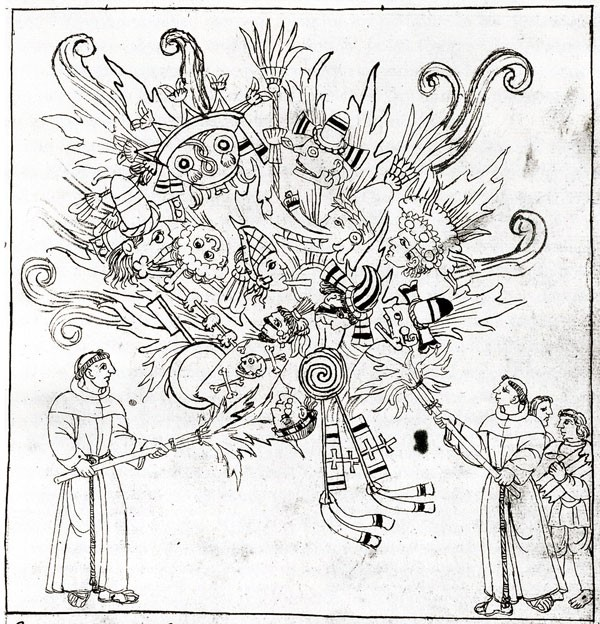
An illustration of the destruction of Indigenous codices by Franciscan friars by Diego Muñoz Camargo (1585)

From the inception of contact between the altepetl and the Spanish conquistadors, submission to Christianity was non-negotiable. As described by historian Ryan Dominic Crewe, "the Spanish offered two clear options: accept Christianity and be saved in this world and in the next, or resist it and face damnation in both." Prior to the fall of Tenōchtitlan, the Spanish could not force compliance because of their heavy dependency on those whom they were admonishing. Conquistador Bernal Diaz del Castillo wrote that "more often than not hungry Spanish soldiers would read their protocol and then promptly settle into a meal prepared by those they had just admonished." After the fall of Tenōchtitlan, the balance of power shifted heavily in favor of the Spanish, who forced Christianization upon the various altepeme.

As it became clear to each altepetl that the Spanish were in Mesoamerica to stay, they quickly learned to use conversion as a means of gaining political capital. By 1523, nobles in Tenōchtitlan had requested baptisms and provided them with properties for their monasteries and churches to assure themselves a place within the new colonial order. Matlatzinca and Otomi peoples in the Valley of Toluca as well as Mixtecs in Oaxaca used baptisms as a means of reclaiming local authority after years of Mexica imperialism in the face of Spanish rule. Throughout the 1520s and 1530s, altepeme retained their autonomy through Christianization and local rulers now adopted new Spanish Christian names: "the names of local elite began to echo those of the men who were turning out to be their overlords rather than their liberators."

Spanish missionaries imposed forms of symbolic and physical violence in the altepetl in order to erect "a new universe of meaning" for Indigenous peoples. A coordinated assault was launched by missionaries and conquistadors on Indigenous priests and adherents on January 1, 1525, which resulted in the destruction of the main temples in Tenōchtitlan, Texcoco, and Tlaxcala, including the Temple of Huītzilōpōchtli, which housed the archives of Texcoco. This wave of violence initiated by the Spanish missionaries emanated outward throughout what would soon become New Spain. A letter written by Christianized Indigenous nobles to the Spanish crown in 1560 records that "people of many altepetl were forced and tortured [or] were hanged or burned because they did not want to relinquish idolatry, and unwillingly received the gospel and faith." It further stated that "it was the friars' 'good deed', they added, to 'teach us to despise, destroy, and burn the stones and wood that we worshiped as gods'." As described by historian Ryan Dominic Crewe, "Friars proudly reported the destruction using biblical scales: twenty thousand idols smashed by a single friar in a day, thousands of local deities delivered to the flames, or five hundred major temples dismantled in just five years.

== Examples ==
- Azcapotzalco
- Cempoala
- Chalco
- Cholula
- Coixtlahuaca
- Colhuacan
- Cuauhnahuac
- Huexotzingo
- Tenōchtitlan
- Texcoco
- Tlatelolco
- Tlaxcala
- Toluca
- Xochimilco
- Yanhuitlán
