= Coatepantli =

Architectural motif found in Mesoamerica

Coatepantli is a Nahuatl word meaning "wall of serpents". It comes from the words coatl meaning serpent and tepantli meaning wall. It is an architectural motif found in archeological sites in Mesoamerica.

== Purpose ==
There is no consensus on the purpose of these walls. Many researchers have suggested that the coatepantli were used to mark the boundary between ceremonial and non-ceremonial land, and at times the word has been used to signify any wall which encloses a sacred space, notably in Tlatelolco. Recent research disputes this and suggests that they varied in their nature, but they were not explicit boundaries between the sacred and the secular.

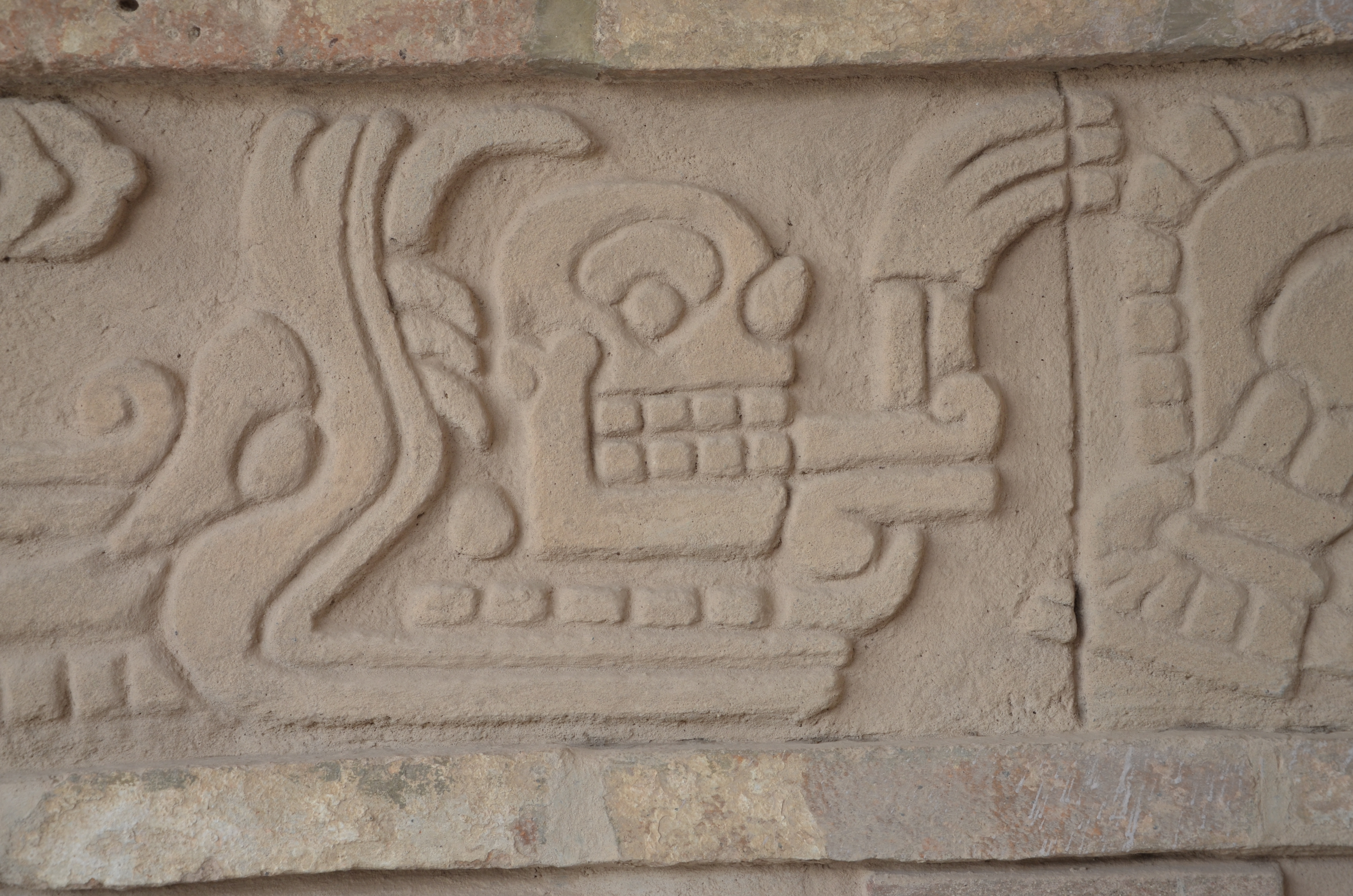
Detail of the coatepantli at Tula

== Examples ==
Only three coatepantli are known to exist. The oldest was constructed at the Tula site between 950 CE and 1200 CE. The Tenayuca and Tenochtitlán coatepantli were constructed around 1500 CE. It is believed that the Tula coatepantli was the prototype for the others.

Aside from the location and date of their construction, these walls are distinct in their forms as well.

=== Tula ===
The 36-meter-long coatepantli of Tula depicts, in bas relief, serpents appearing to devour skeletal figures. Some sources describe the figures as leaving the mouths of the snakes, and others describe them as being carried by the snakes.

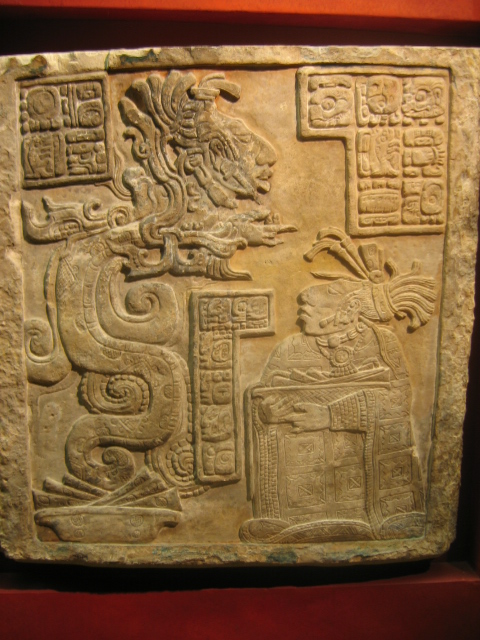
Lintel stone from Yaxchilan depicting a man emerging from the mouth of a vision serpent.

Originally the background and flesh of the skeletal figures was painted red. The serpents were painted either blue or yellow in an alternating pattern. The teeth of the serpents and the bones of the skeletal figure were white.

One interpretation of these carvings is that the snakes represent the earth consuming the dead or the need for human sacrifice to appease the gods. Another theory asserts that the skeletons are representations of past kings or warriors and that the serpents, rather than being symbols of the earth, are rather markers of royalty. Jorge R. Acosta, the discoverer of the coatepantli at Tula believed the skeletal figure was a representation of Tlahuizcalpantecuhtli, the Lord of the Dawn, who was often depicted with a skeletal face.

Analogs to the iconography found at Tula can also be found at Pre-Columbian Mayan sites such as Chichen Itza and Yaxchilan.

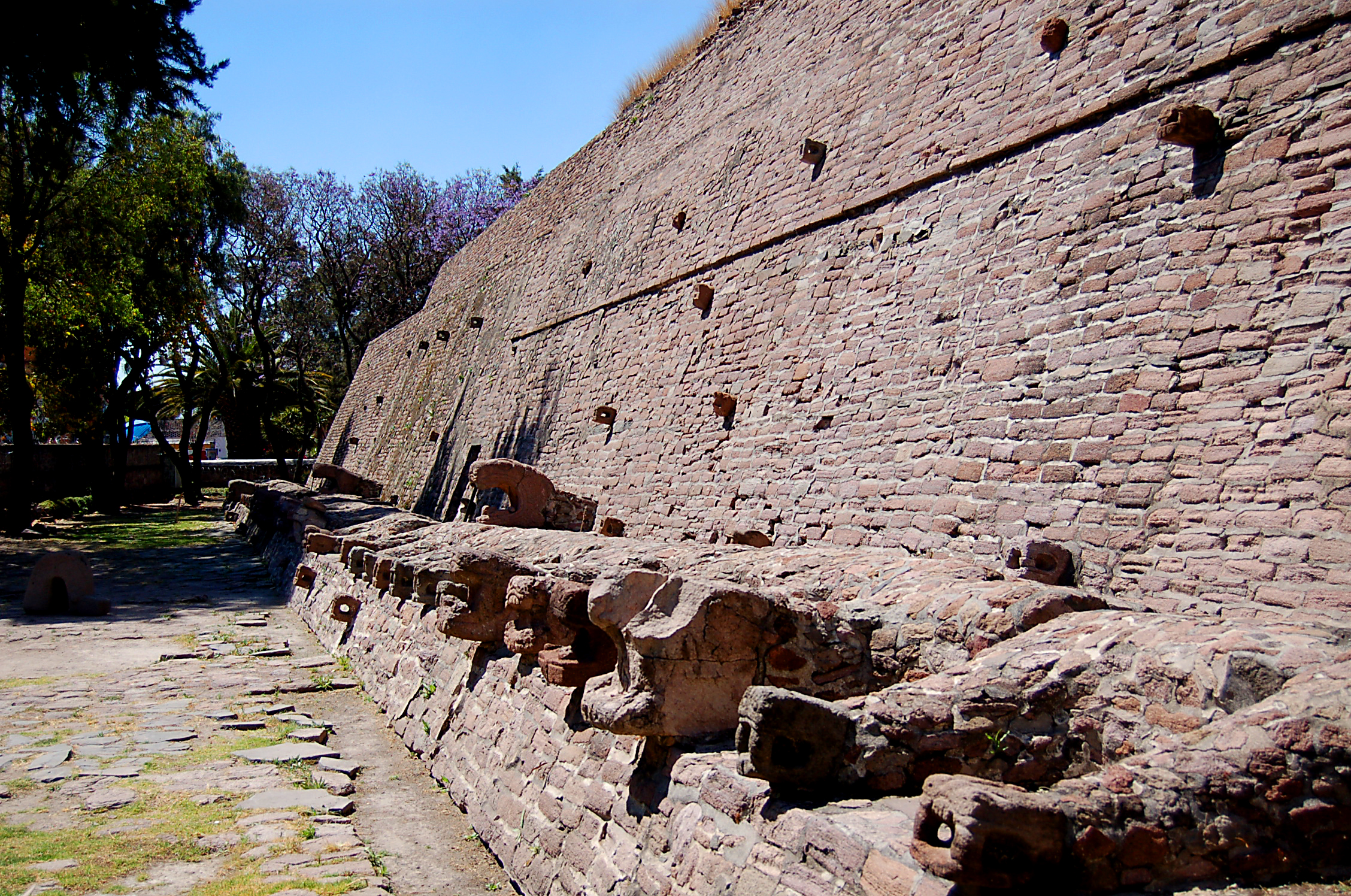
Coatepantli wall at Tenayuca pyramid

=== Tenayuca ===
The wall at Tenayuca is 170 meters long and features 138 sculpted rattle snakes on three sides of the base of the temple pyramid. The snakes on the east and west side were painted green to represent the god of rain and fertility Tláloc. The snakes on the north side were painted red and black to represent the war god Huitzilopochtli. Similar to the coatepantli of Tula, the wall here is believed to be represent fire and regeneration.

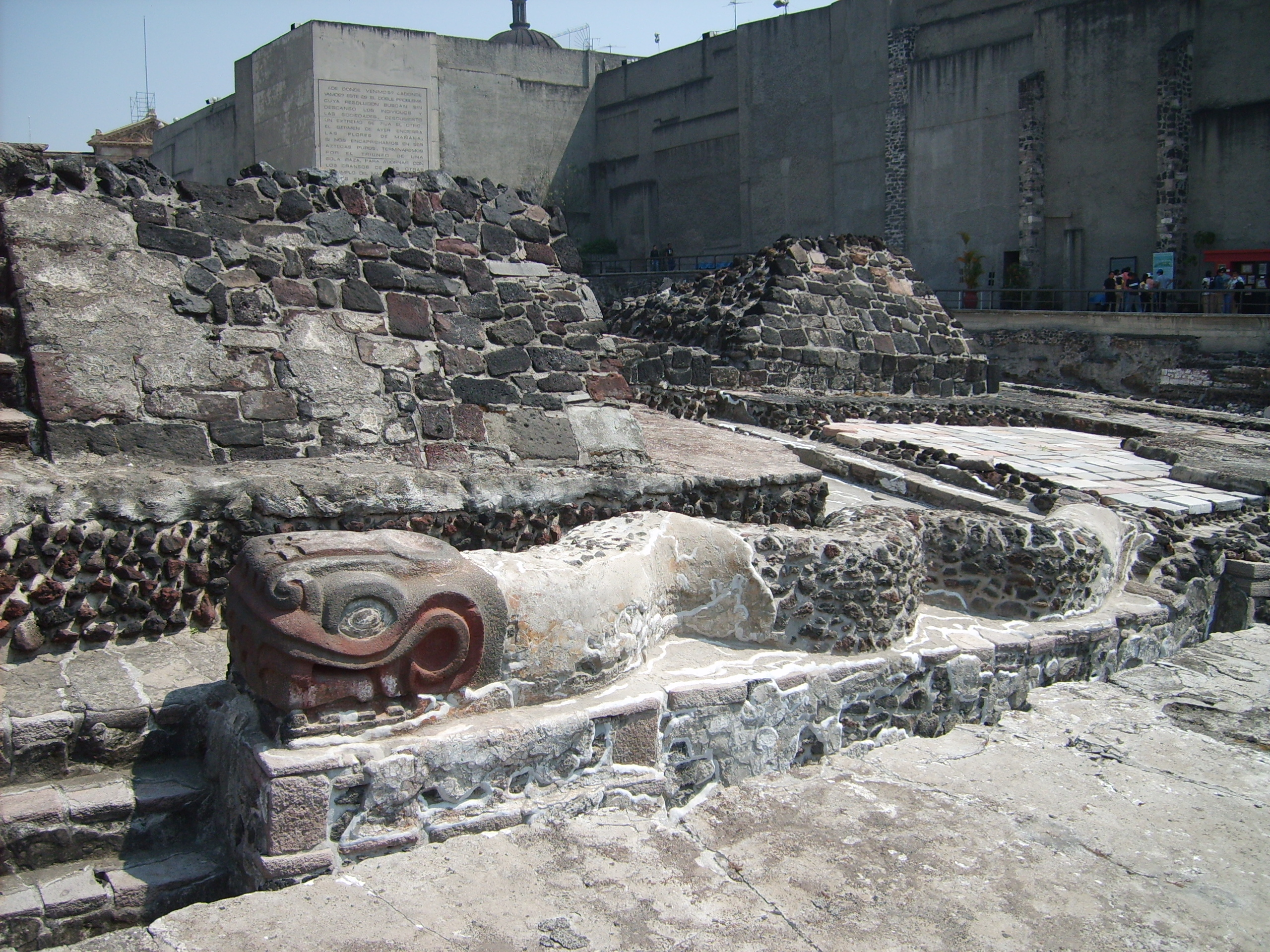
Coatepantli at Templo Mayor in Mexico City

=== Tenochtitlán ===
Based on second-hand accounts, the wall at Tenochtitlán was thought for many years to have enclosed the entirety of the sacred precinct of Tenochtitlán and consist of numerous snakes, but archaeological work in 1981 revealed that the sacred precinct of the city extended beyond the coatepantli and that the coatepantli consisted of two walls in the form of large snakes with painted heads, surrounding the Templo Mayor. One snake was situated to the north of the temple and was painted blue to represent the rain god Tláloc. The other, around the southern side of the pyramid, was painted ochre and represented the war god Hitzilopochtli.
