= Tlatelolco (archaeological site) =

Archaeological site in Mexico City

Coordinates: 19°27′3.9″N 99°08′15″W

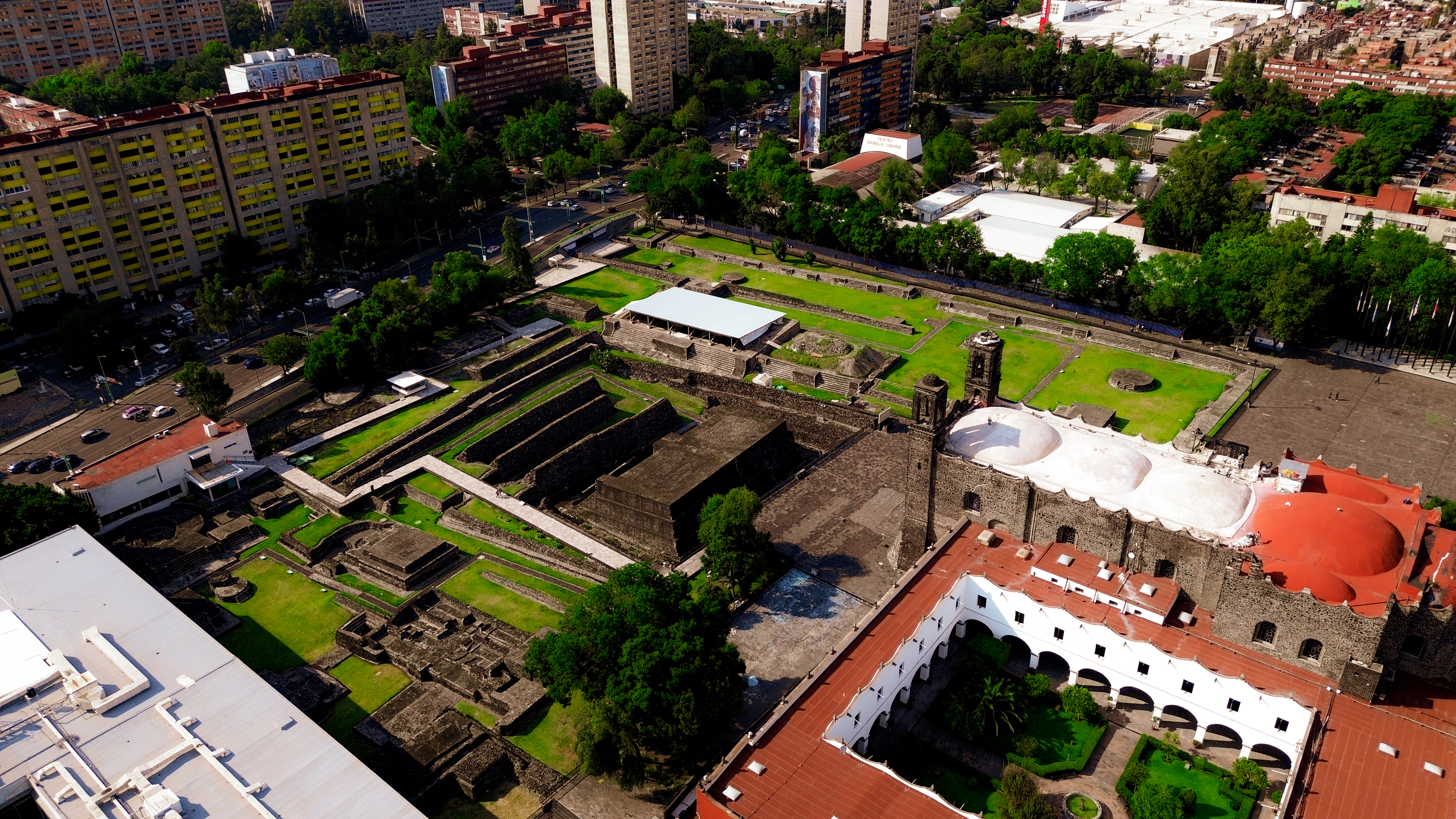
Aerial view of Tlatelolco archeological area.

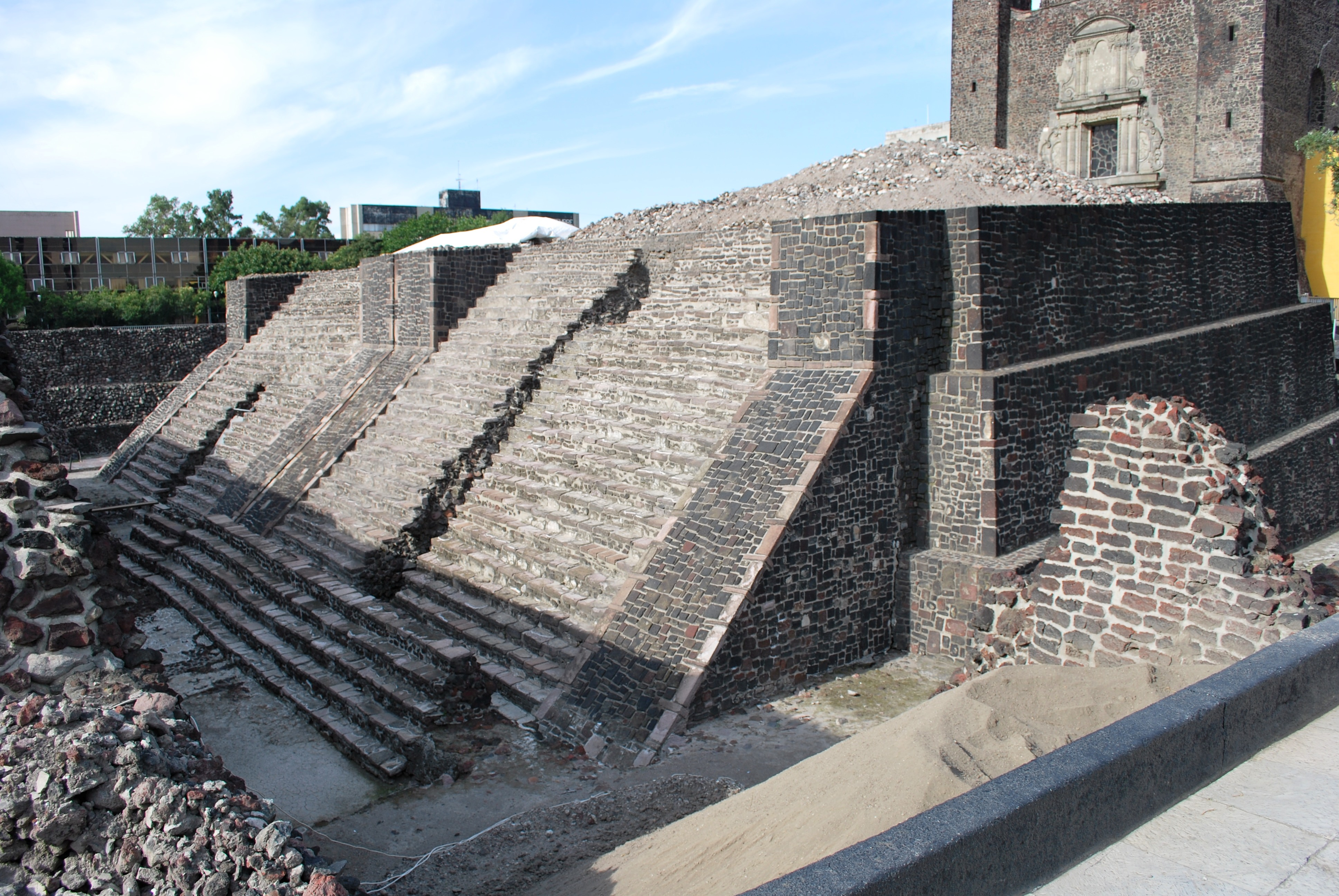
Ruins of the main temple

Tlatelolco is an archaeological excavation site in Mexico City, Mexico, where remains of the pre-Columbian city-state of the same name have been found. It is centered on the Plaza de las Tres Culturas. On one side of the square is this excavated Tlatelolco site, on a second is the oldest European school of higher learning in the Americas called the Colegio de Santa Cruz de Tlatelolco, and on the third stands a mid-20th-century modern office complex, formerly housing the Mexican Foreign Ministry, and since 2005 used as the Centro Cultural Universitario of UNAM (National University of Mexico).

Tlatelolco was founded in 1338, thirteen years later than Tenochtitlan. At the main temple of Tlatelolco, archeologists recently discovered a pyramid within the visible temple; the pyramid is more than 700 years old. This indicates that the site is older than previously thought, according to the Instituto Nacional de Antropología e Historia (National Institute of Anthropology and History; INAH). Because this pyramid has design features similar to pyramids found in Tenayuca and Tenochtitlan, this site may prove to be the first mixed Aztec and Tlatelolca construction found in Mexico.

== Site ==
In the archaeological area there are temples dedicated to Mexican deities such as Quetzalcoatl, Ehecatl and Huītzilōpōchtli. Prehispanic structures are mainly distributed to the south and north of the so-called Major Temple. Some of the most important identified buildings are:

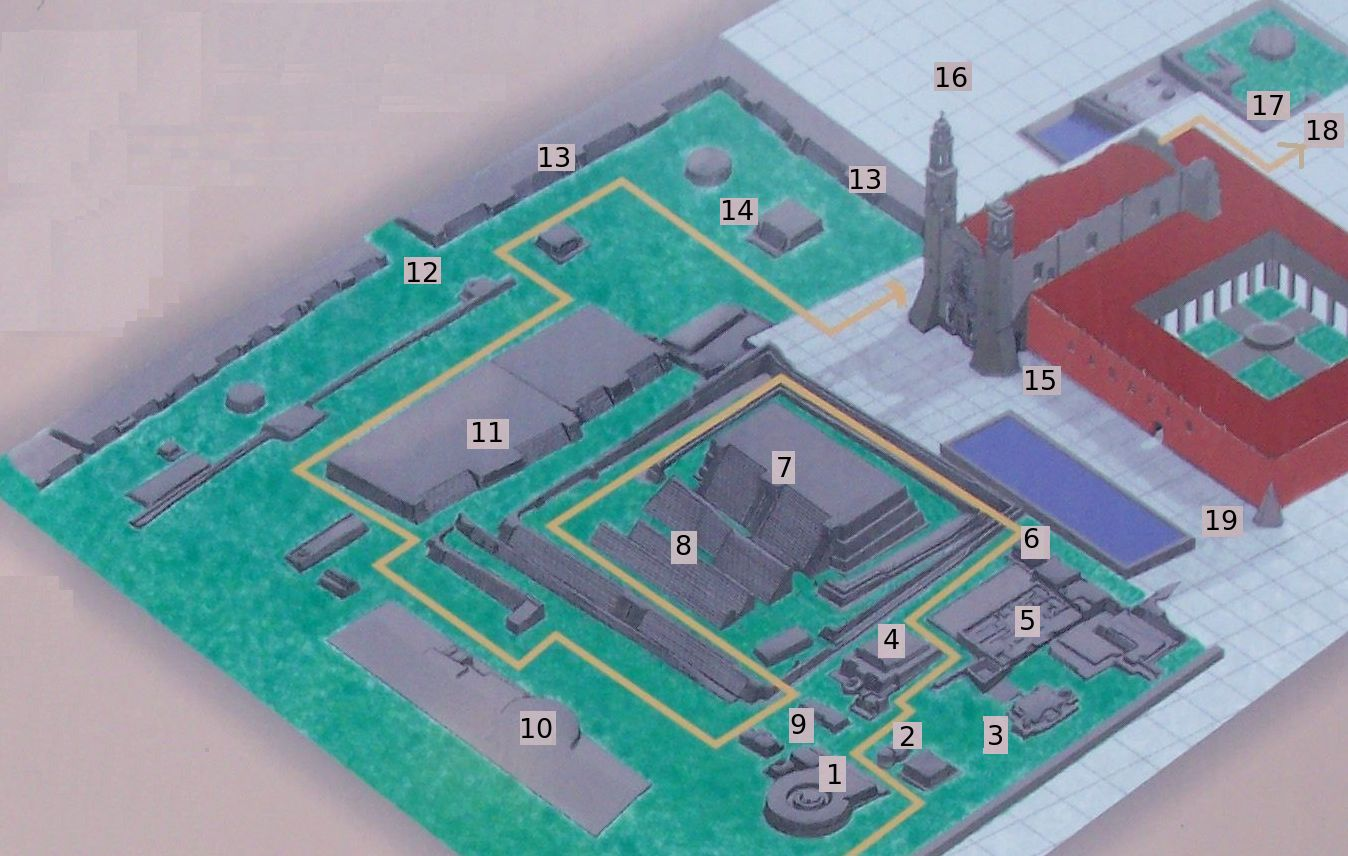
Location of buildings in Tlatelolco: 1) Temple of Ehecatl-Quetzalcoatl, 2) Overlapping circular altars, 3) Tzompantli Altar of the south courtyard, 4) Calendar temple, 5) The Palace, 6) Temple of the Paintings, 7) Major Temple - Phase II, 8) Stages of construction of the Major Temple, 9) The lovers of Tlatelolco, 10) West Platform, 11) The Great Basement, 12) Road Tepeyac, 13) Northern boundary of the enclosure, 14) North Tzomplantli altar, 15) College of Santa Cruz de Tlatelolco, 16) Plaza de las Tres Culturas, 17) Zona Chica, 18) Towards Tecpan and 19) Caja de agua, mural painting of 1536.

- Major Temple. It is the largest structure; it is located in the central part of the area and the characteristics of stage II resemble those of Tenayuca and the Templo Mayor of Tenochtitlan. It is a platform of three bodies with wide steps split in two by central and lateral alfardas. Apparently, this building was taller than that of Tenochtitlan.
- Calendar Temple. It shows a board decorated with unusual reliefs at the first three trecenas of the pre-Hispanic calendar Tōnalpōhualli. It is the only minor temple with double staircase. In its main façade a mural painting with the creative deities of the pre-Hispanic calendar is shown.
- Temple R or Wind Complexes. It is a structure in whose upper part remains of an adoration dedicated to Ehecatl, corresponding to an earlier stage. In front of it were found burials and offerings composed of children –inside pots–, shells, stones and ceramic figurines.
- The Palace. It is a structure composed of four small rooms with a central courtyard and an altar, as well as Remains of a wide portal.
- Altar V. It is a minor building with four concentric staircases apparently dedicated to Tlāloc.
- Temple of Paintings (buildings X and L). Three of the facades of the building L are topped with fists in high relief. This building owes its name to the mural painting of its facades, panels and alfardas. The design of the talud-tableau is identical to that found in the red temples of the Tenochtitlan ceremonial enclosure.

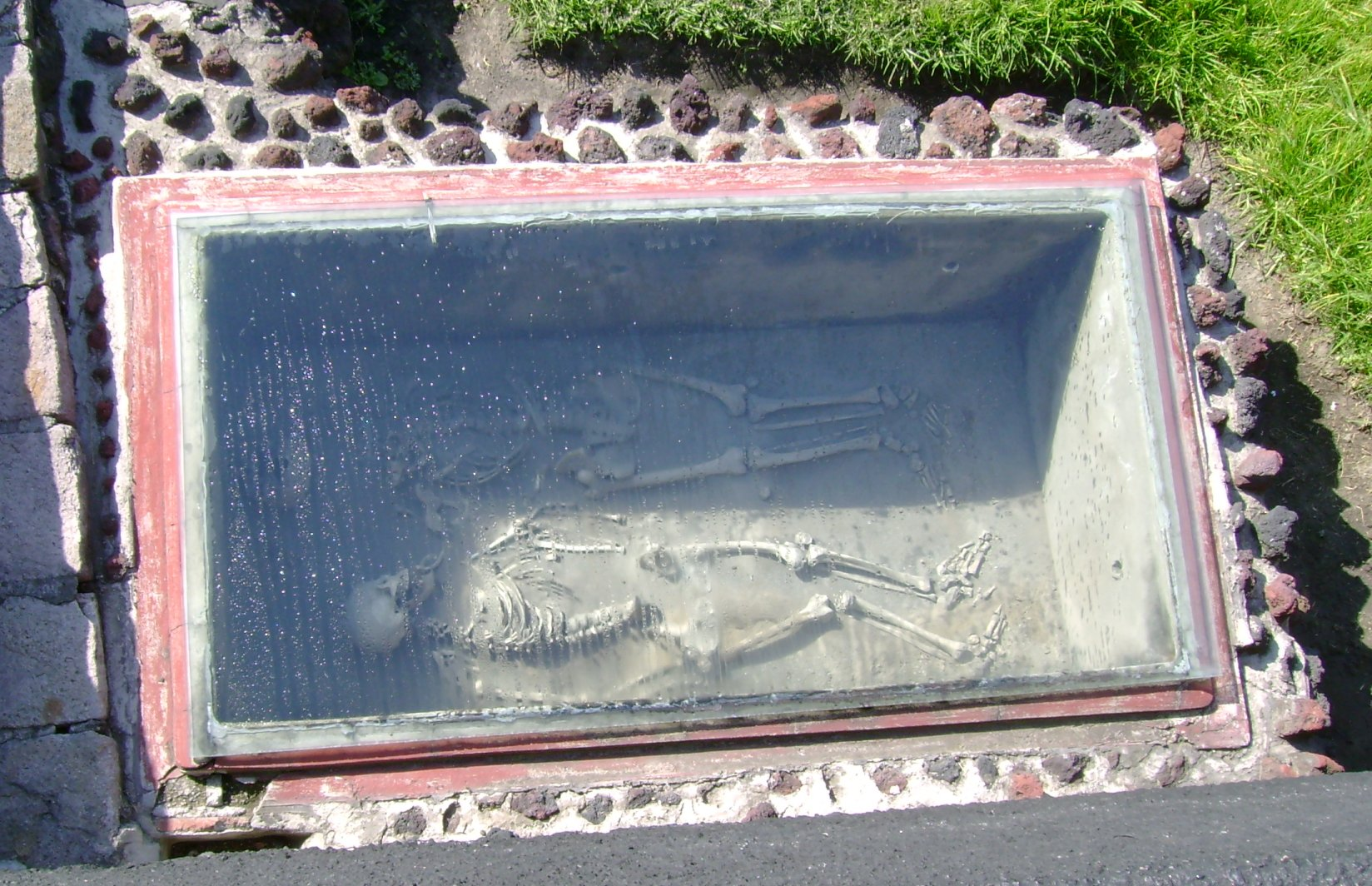
Lovers of Tlatelolco

- Coatepantli. It means "wall of snakes" and it is a construction that framed the space that connects with the north causeway towards Tepeyac.
- Altar Tzompantli (Temple). It is characterized by a glyph at the top of the southern alfarda. In this temple were located skulls of decapitated perforated by the parietals.

Aztec glyph of Tlatelolco

- Altar D1. It is located in front of the north entrance of Coatepantli, and reduced access to the north courtyard.
- Temples I and J. Buildings joined by a huge platform, of which only the western half has been discovered. Temple I is the only building built entirely with pink quarry ashlery, like partitions. Building J shows similar but smaller features.
- Lovers of Tlatelolco. There was found a burial of 54 people with their respective offerings, they were part of many more considered the victims of the war of year 1473 between Tenochtitlan and Tlatelolco. Representative of these 54 people is this couple being him 55 years old and she 35 years old. As they found themselves hugged they were called "The Lovers of Tlatelolco".

== The archaeological finds of Tlatelolco ==
=== A look at the human sacrifices in Tlatelolco ===
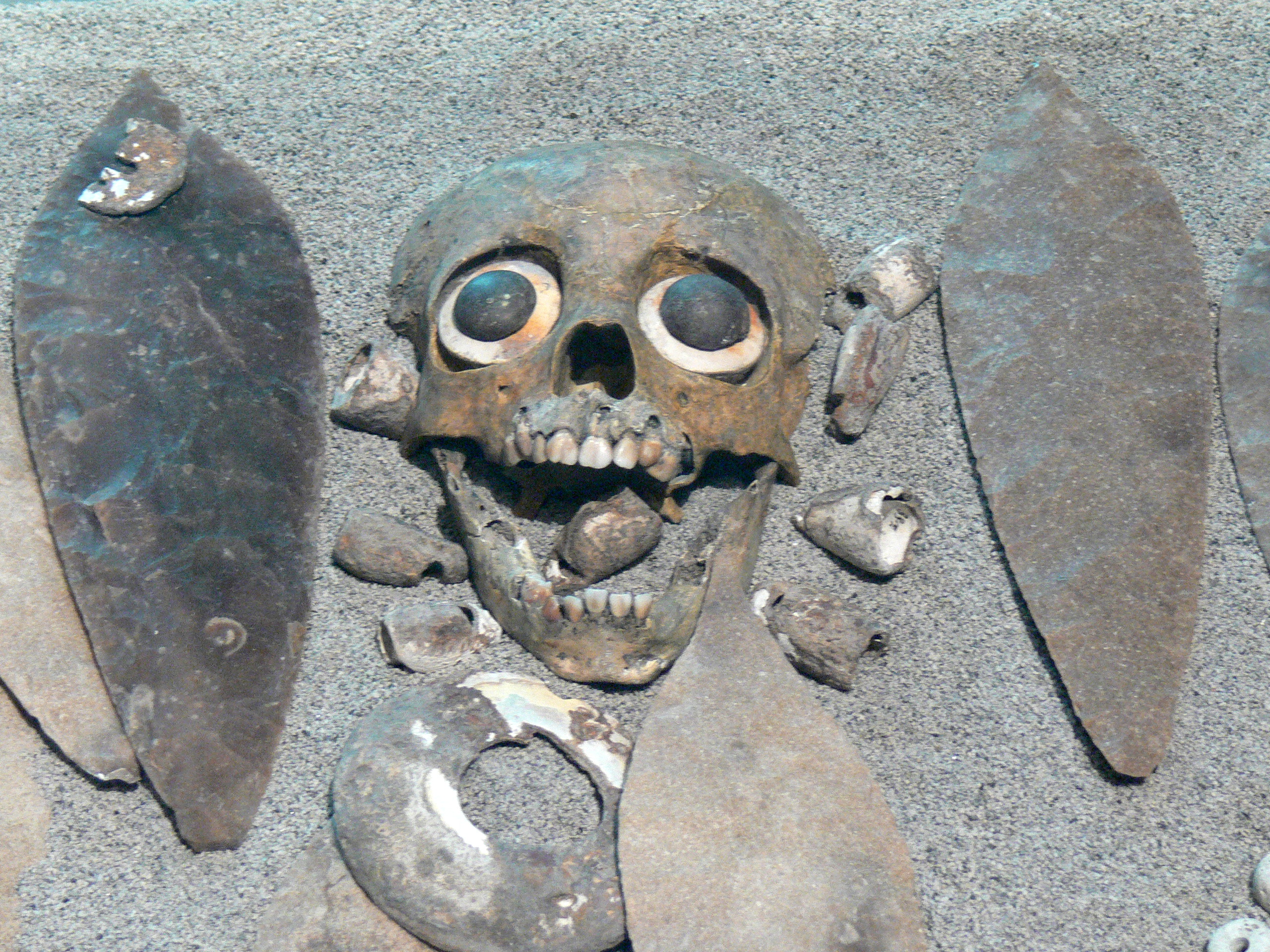
Sacrifice of children from Tlatelolco. National Museum of Anthropology in Mexico City.

Archaeological excavations and research have been able to explain why there were many childhood remains inside a particular temple in Tlatelolco.

Due to a famine and a serious outbreak of disease, which has not been clarified so far, “in the years 1454-1457 hundreds of children were sacrificed to the God Tlaloque (which is a group of gods with small bodies) in Tlatelolco”. Ehecatl-Quetzalcoatl, the Aztec god of the wind, was considered one of the Tlaloque, and served as the power that blew obstacles from the way to give way to the rain. Rain nourishes the Earth and washes evil and disease. Interestingly, Tlaloque was also known to be the pattern of disease. Thus, the tlaloques are related to these two contrasting forces.

Osteopathological and dental pathological tests made of remains of children sacrificed in Tenochtitlan and Tlatelolco, many of them were children whose health conditions were poor to varying degrees.

One theory of why children were chosen to be sacrificed in the ritual is that they were children who contracted the disease during the famine and were selected to supplant the dual powers of Tlaloque. It is also believed that because of their size, children were often selected to personify the small deities represented in Tlaloque figures. (De La Cruz, González‐Oliver et al, 524)

The above is not the only theory that has been studied, as it has also been proposed that children were chosen as victims of sacrifices, because their youth provided them with purity to properly communicate with the gods and obtain their favor (López Austin 1984, Vol.1: 324). In addition, Ehecatl-Quetzalcoatl was a male deity, and therefore it has been found a greater number of remains of men, as it was believed that the sacrificed men personified better the representation of the divine that women offered. (De La Cruz, González‐Oliver et al, 524)

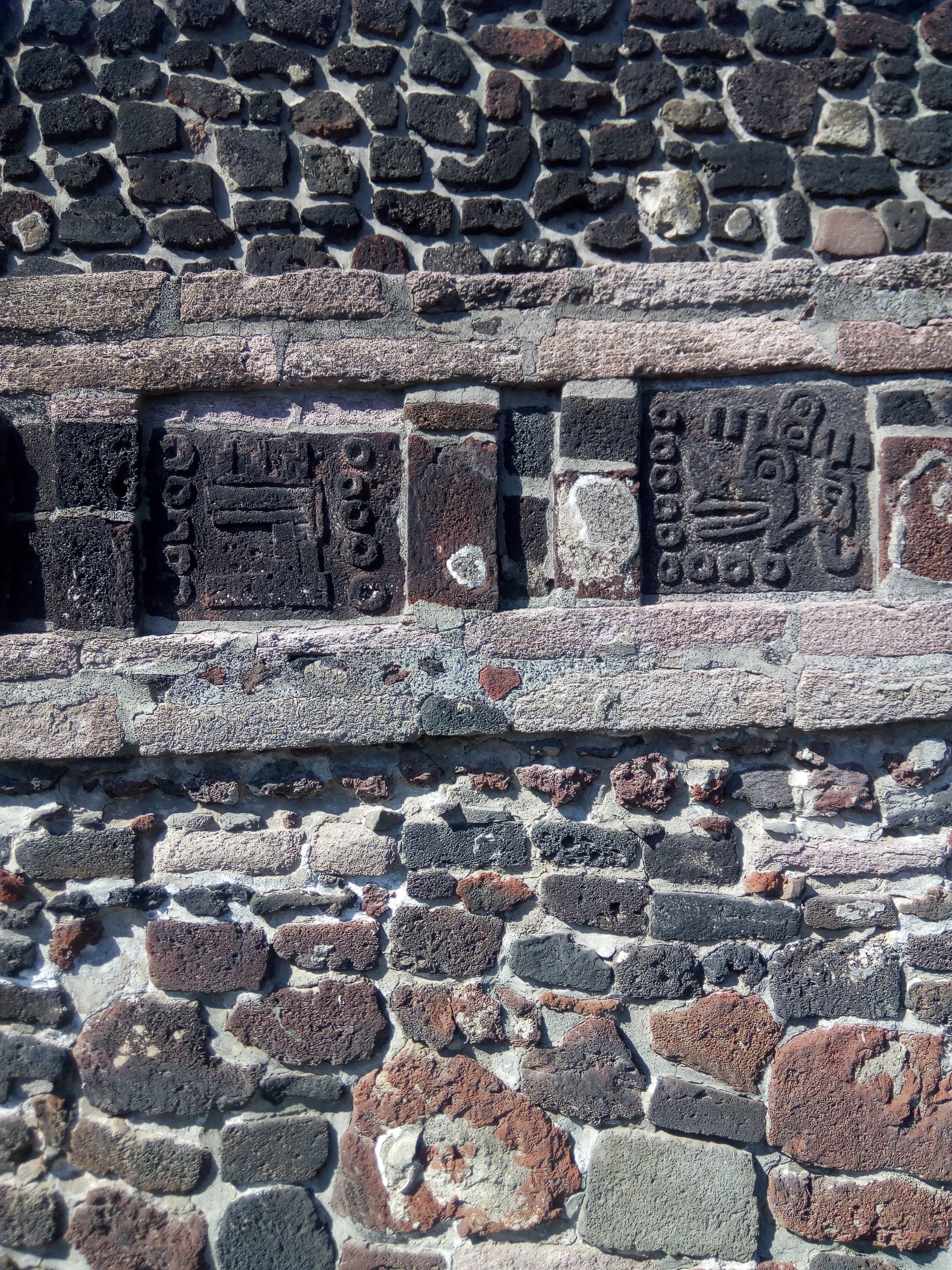
Iconography at Tlatelolco

=== Offerings ===
In Tlatelolco, the burials that have been found have demonstrated a great diversity in the form and customs with which the deceased were buried.

It has been found that they differ from each other in terms of the number and quality of the pieces that have been found in them. Ceramic objects consist mainly of dishes, crockery, pots and figurines.

In the archaeological site and its surroundings a large number of children's burials have been found, in which researchers have found the widespread tradition of performing burials with ceramic objects that were most likely used as instruments of play by the deceased child, among the most common play objects that have been found are clay marbles, ceramic figures with animal shapes, and personal objects of the deceased such as vessels or small knives of obsidian.

An interesting fact is the existence of offerings consisting of human bones. There are three burial sites representing three stages of life. In the first, a juvenile left radius for a child burial; an adult radius for an adult burial; and a more older, left, radius.

=== Discovery of mass grave ===
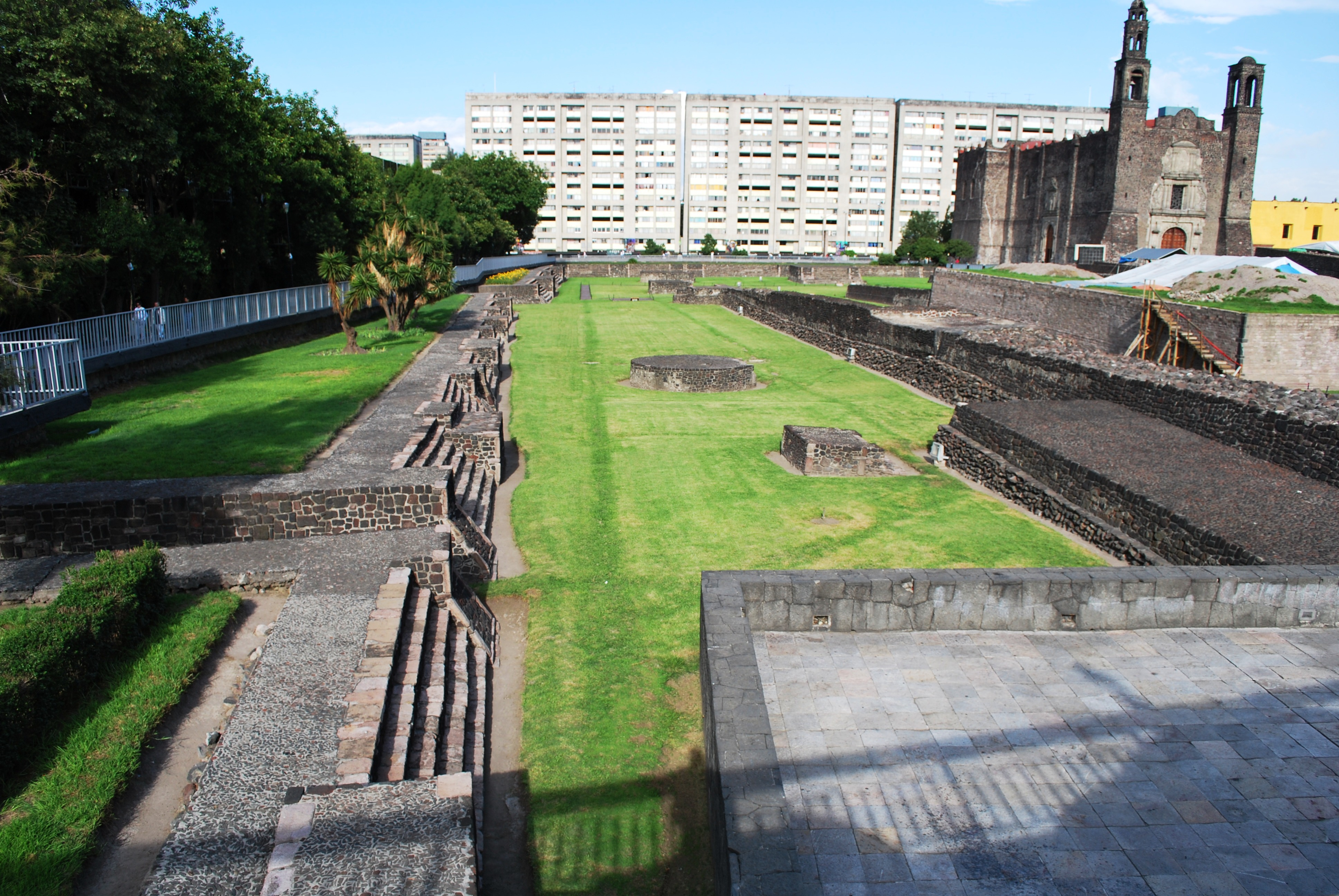
Northern boundary of the Tlatelolco archeological zone

On 10 February 2009, INAH archaeologists announced the discovery of a mass grave containing forty-nine human skeletons, laid out in neat lines on their backs, with their arms crossed and wrapped in maguey leaves. The archaeologists located the skeletons in a 13-by-32-foot (four-by-10-meter) burial site as they took part in a search for a palace complex at the Tlatelolco site. The grave was determined to be from the period of the Spanish conquest.

The remains found include those of forty-five young adults, two children, a teenager, and an elderly person wearing a ring that potentially signifies a higher status. Most of the young men were tall, and several had broken bones that had healed, characteristics of warriors.

The team expects to locate at least 50 additional bodies. The grave contained evidence both of Aztec rituals, such as offerings of incense and animal sacrifice, and Spanish elements, such as buttons and a bit of glass.

Salvador Guilliem, head of the site for the governmental archaeology institute, expressed his astonishment at the find:

"We were completely taken by surprise. We didn't expect to find this massive funeral complex."

He said that it was likely that the indigenous people buried in this grave died while fighting the invading Spanish. They may also have died due to infectious diseases, such as the hemorrhagic fever epidemics in 1545 and 1576, which caused the deaths of a large proportion of the native population. Susan Gillespie of the University of Florida suggested an alternative theory: that the men may have been held as prisoners by the Spanish for some time and executed later.

The site differs from most other Spanish conquest-era graves in the area, because of the manner in which the bodies were buried. The burial was similar to those according to Christian customs of the time. This is in contrast to the thousands of graves found in other Aztec cities, where bodies were found en masse without ritual arrangement. Guilliem added: "It is a mass grave, but they were very carefully buried."

=== Ceramics ===
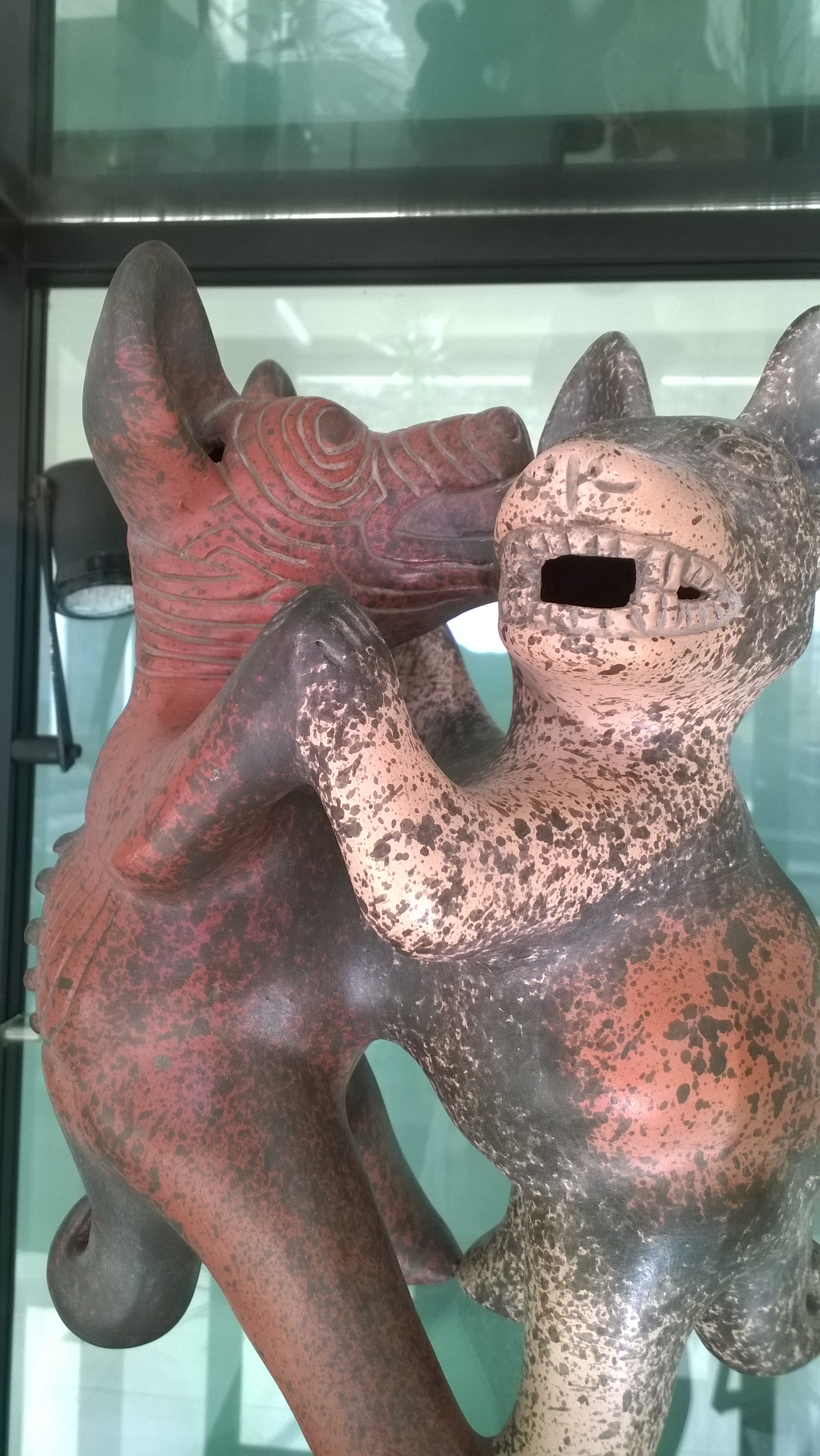
Ceramics from Tlatelolco archaeological site

Since ancient times art has been a tool among peoples to document the cultural and political pulse of a society. In the case of Tlatelolco, there was a lot of movement and interaction among the indigenous peoples who occupied the region, thanks to this, the design in the ceramic artifacts reveals unique styles of some tribes or geographic regions that influenced the life of the Tlatelolcan society due to its importance as a commercial center and interchange between different cultures, and we can observe the evolution of ceramic utensils from the beginning of the city to the occupation by the Spanish colonizers.

"Chichimeca pottery was a precursor to Aztec and continued in the latter without radical changes of style, although of course some alterations arose over time. Clay vessels, decorated with a simple linear pattern of black color on a background color of leather, or orange show four distinct phases, called, by the places in which most specimens have been found, styles of Colhuacan, of Tenayuca, Tenochtitlan and Tlatelolco. Vaillant managed to determine his Chronology by means of a skilful combination.”

Tenochtitlan's style began around 1400, that of Tlatelolco around 1450. In the first half of the 15th century, this Aztec pottery, in the strict sense, is mostly presented in Texcoco and the dependent towns of it, because this city was in those days in full apogee under the scepter of Nezahualcóyotl. Both styles were extended from this date throughout the valley of Mexico, which formed a political and cultural unit since the establishment of the tripartite League of Tenochtitlan-Texcoco-Tlatelolco, the same alliance that generated the evolution in ceramics that were manufactured in the region, until finally reaching a style in which the influence of Spanish models is clearly perceived. These examples show once again how the most insignificant and fragile part of man's cultural heritage can play an important role as a witness in the verification of historical facts and in supporting written traditions.

== See also ==
- Tlatelolco (altepetl)
- Plaza de las Tres Culturas
