= Tenayuca =

Archaeological site in Mexico

Pyramid of Tenayuca
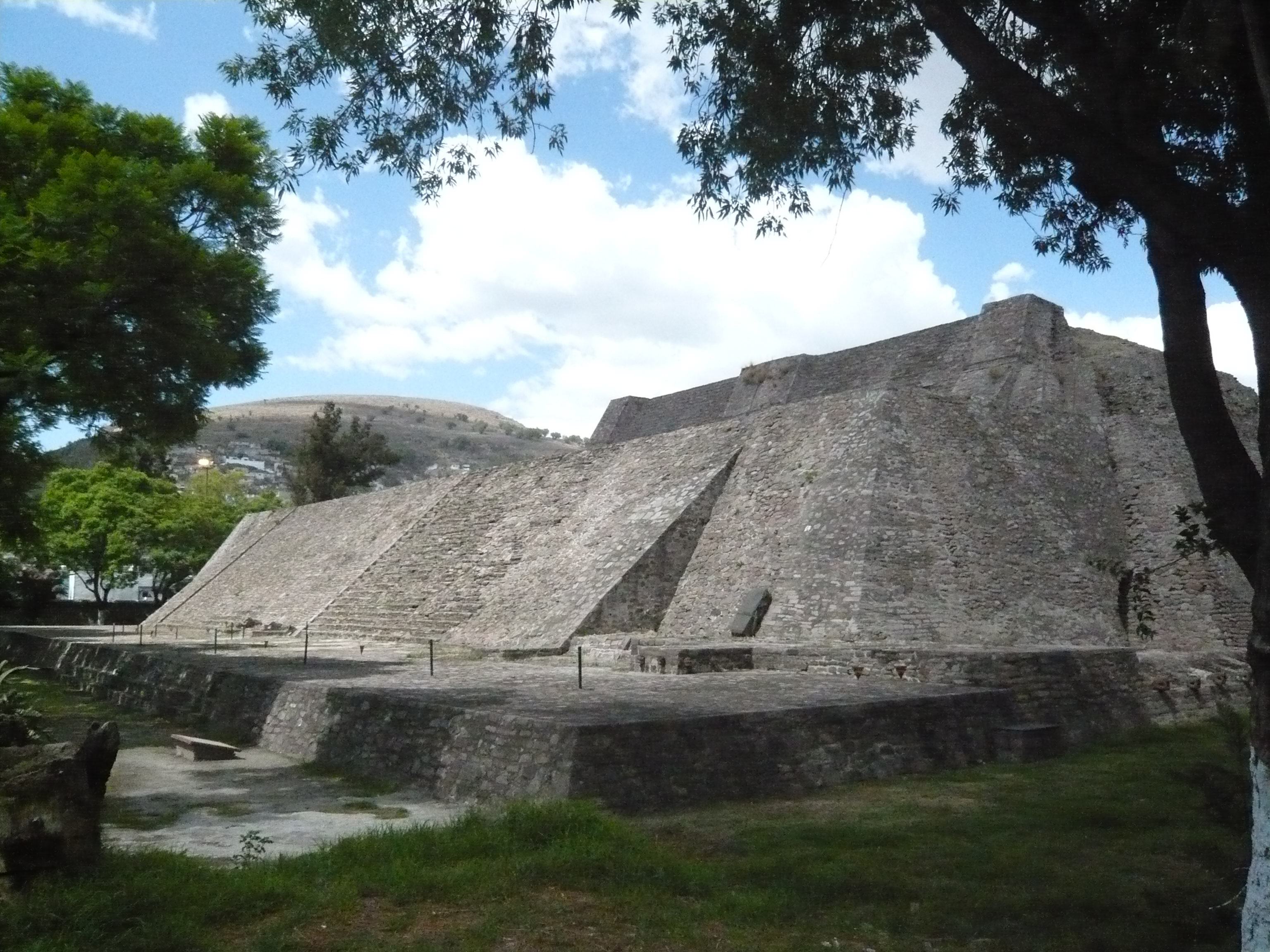
- The Aztec pyramid of Tenayuca

Religion
- Region: Valley of Mexico
- Status: preserved, with museum

Location
- Location: Greater Mexico City
- Municipality: Tlalnepantla de Baz
- State: Mexico State
- Interactive map of Pyramid of Tenayuca
- Coordinates: 19°31′55.8″N 99°10′6.5″W

Architecture
- Type: Temple
- Style: Aztec

Specifications
- Direction of façade: West
- Length: 52 m (171 ft)
- Width: 60 m (200 ft)

Website
- Tenayuca at INAH (in Spanish)

Tenayuca (Nahuatl languages: Tenanyohcān pronounced [te.naˈyoʔ.kaːn]) is a pre-Columbian Mesoamerican archaeological site in the Valley of Mexico. In the Postclassic period of Mesoamerican chronology, Tenayuca was a settlement on the former shoreline of the western arm of Lake Texcoco. It was located approximately 10 kilometres (6.2 mi) to the northwest of Tenochtitlan (the heart of present-day Mexico City).

Tenayuca is considered to be the earliest capital city of the Chichimec, nomadic tribes who migrated and settled in the Valley of Mexico, where they formed their own empire.

== Etymology ==
Tenayuca means walled place in Nahuatl.

== Location ==
The temple of Tenayuca is located in San Bartolo Tenayuca in Tlalnepantla de Baz, in Mexico State. It falls within the urban sprawl of Greater Mexico City.

== History ==
By some historiographic traditions Tenayuca had been founded ca. 1224 by Xolotl, a semi-legendary ruler of a "Chichimec" tribe that had settled in the Valley of Mexico in the period some time after the 12th-century collapse of the former political hegemony in the Valley — the so-called Toltec empire, emanating from Tula. Xolotl was succeeded by Nopaltzin who consolidated the Chichimec empire . His son, Tlotzin, became lord of Tenayuca. When Nopaltzin died, his successor Quinatzin transferred the seat of Chichimec power to Texcoco, relegating Tenayuca to a site of secondary importance.

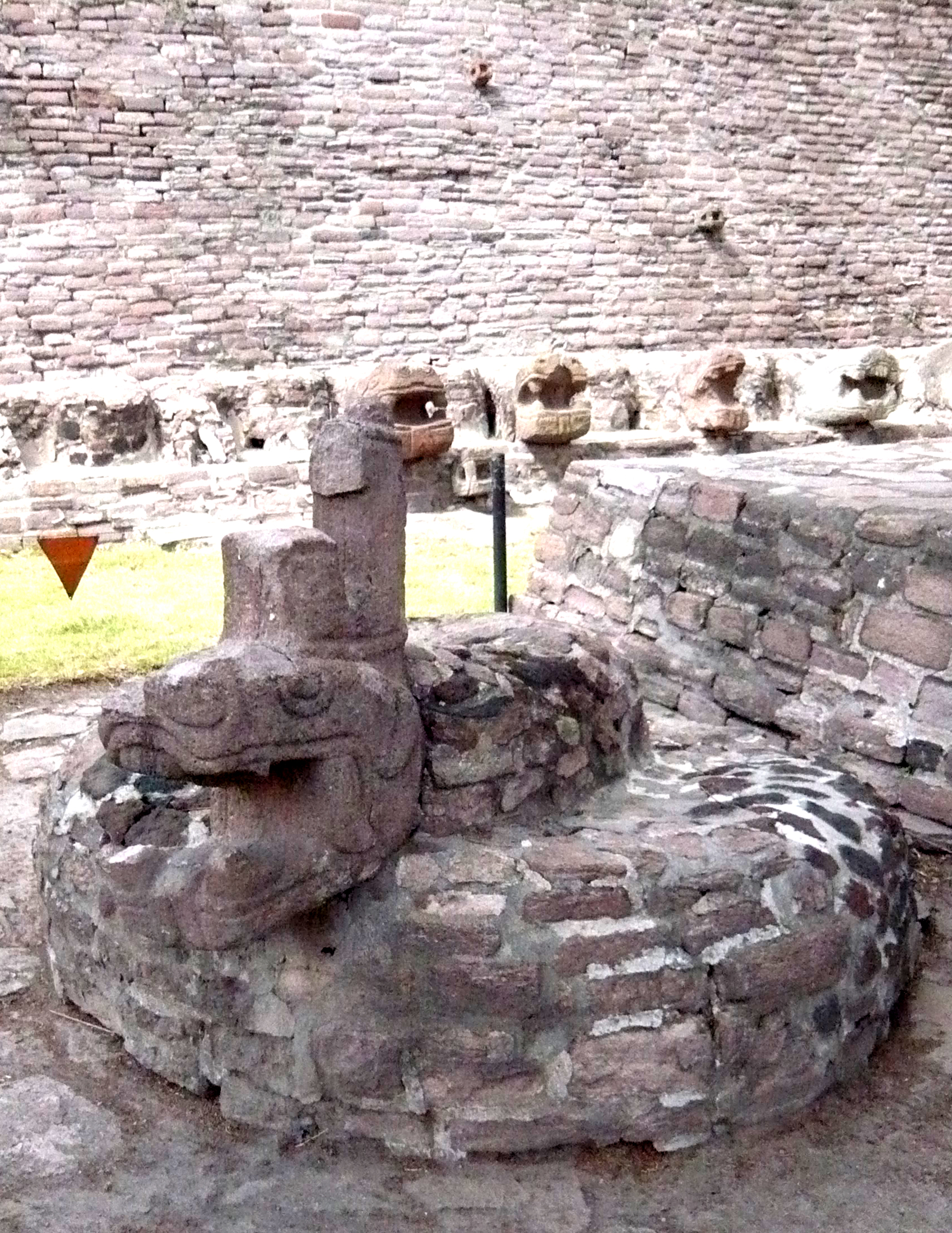
Left:xiuhcoatl statue at Tenayuca, Aztec period Right:Location of Tenayuca in the basin of Mexico. Click to enlarge.

However archaeological remains recovered from Tenayuca indicate that the site had already been occupied in the Classic Period, long before this foundational event described in several of the Mesoamerican historical documents. Its population increased in the early Postclassic and continued to increase after the fall of Tula, when Tenayuca became an important regional power.

In the late 13th century A.D., some time after the arrival of the Chichimecs at Tenayuca, Tochintecuhtli, the ruling lord of Tenayuca, allied himself with Huetzin, lord of the Acolhuas of Coatlichán, and their alliance dominated the central Valley of Mexico, extending as far northeast as Tulancingo. By the mid 14th century the power of Tenayuca had already waned, it was conquered and replaced as a regional power by nearby Azcapotzalco. Around 1434, Tenochtitlan conquered Tenayuca, bringing it into the Aztec Empire.

At the time of the Spanish Conquest Tenayuca was still occupied, and fighting took place there in 1520. The conquistador Bernal Díaz del Castillo referred to Tenayuca as the "town of the serpents".

At some point the site was abandoned. It was rediscovered during excavations made by Mexican archaeologists in 1925.

== Genesis of Aztec sacred architecture ==
Aztec temple architecture primarily developed at Tenayuca, which has the earliest example yet found of the typical Aztec double pyramid, which consists of joined pyramidal bases supporting two temples. After Tenayuca came under Aztec dominance, the Aztecs adopted this innovative style for the worship of their own deities.

The temple of Tenayuca is better preserved than the similar temple of Tlatelolco and its wall of serpents remains mostly intact on three sides of the base of the pyramid.

== Site layout and description ==
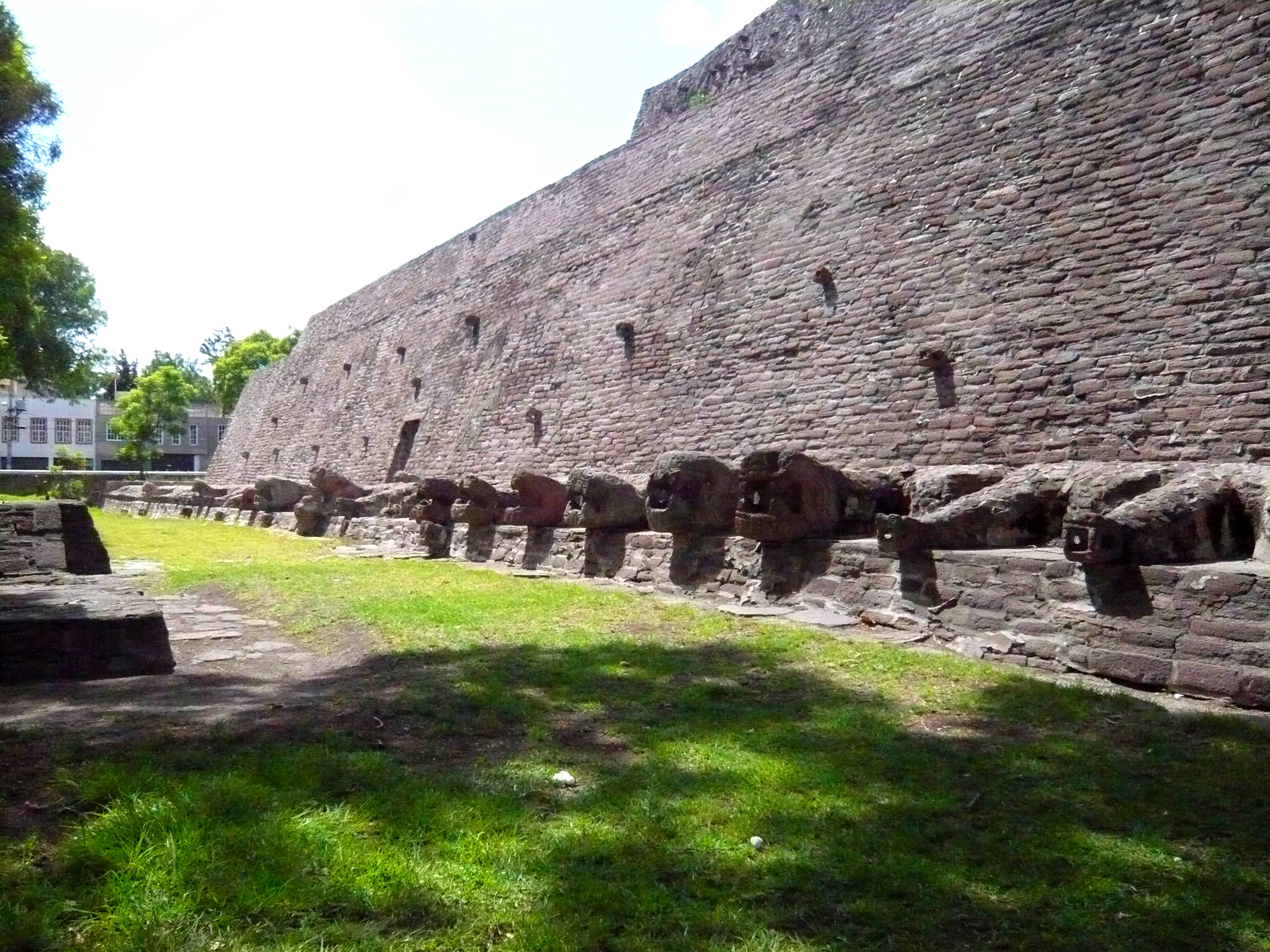
The base of the Aztec temple of Tenayuca — adorned with a row of rattlesnake sculptures, known as coatepantli in Nahuatl.

The site consists of a massive truncated temple platform with a double stairway rising on the western side to where the twin temples of Tlaloc and Huitzilopochtli once stood. The temple of Tlaloc occupied the northern part of the main temple while the Huitzilopochtli temple stood to the south. Some of the temple steps are carved with year-glyphs such as knives, circles and shields. To the south of the stairway at ground level is a projecting platform bearing sculptures of crossed bones and projecting skulls.

Like many Mesoamerican temples, various phases of construction were built one on top of the other. In the case of Tenayuca, the size of the building increased through six phases of construction but the basic form remained unchanged. The original double pyramid was enlarged five times, the first time probably in 1299 and then successively at 52-year intervals. The last phase of construction probably dates to 1507 and measures 62 meters wide by 50 meters deep. Aztec influence is apparent from the third stage in 1351, the following stages were purely Aztec in style, as demonstrated by the sloping tiers of the pyramid rather than the vertical walls apparent in the earlier stages.

The grand temple base is surrounded by a coatepantli (Nahuatl for wall of serpents), a low platform supporting 138 stone sculptures of snakes. Their bodies were once covered with plaster and painted in a variety of colours, with their scales painted black. On the north and south sides of the temple, at ground level, are two sculptures of coiled serpents . The crests on their heads bear markings representing the stars and identify them as Xiuhcoatl (the fire serpent). All the serpent sculptures around the temple were associated with fire and sun worship.

There are several altars and shrines nearby that were also excavated, some of these also have serpent sculptures.

200 meters from the main temple of Tenayuca are the remains of what appear to have been an elite residential complex, with surviving plaster floors in some rooms. This area has been labelled Tenayuca II by archaeologists and appears to have gone through various phases of construction.

The temple of Tenayuca is in the care of the Instituto Nacional de Antropología e Historia (National Institute of Anthropology and History) and is open to the public.

== Photo gallery ==
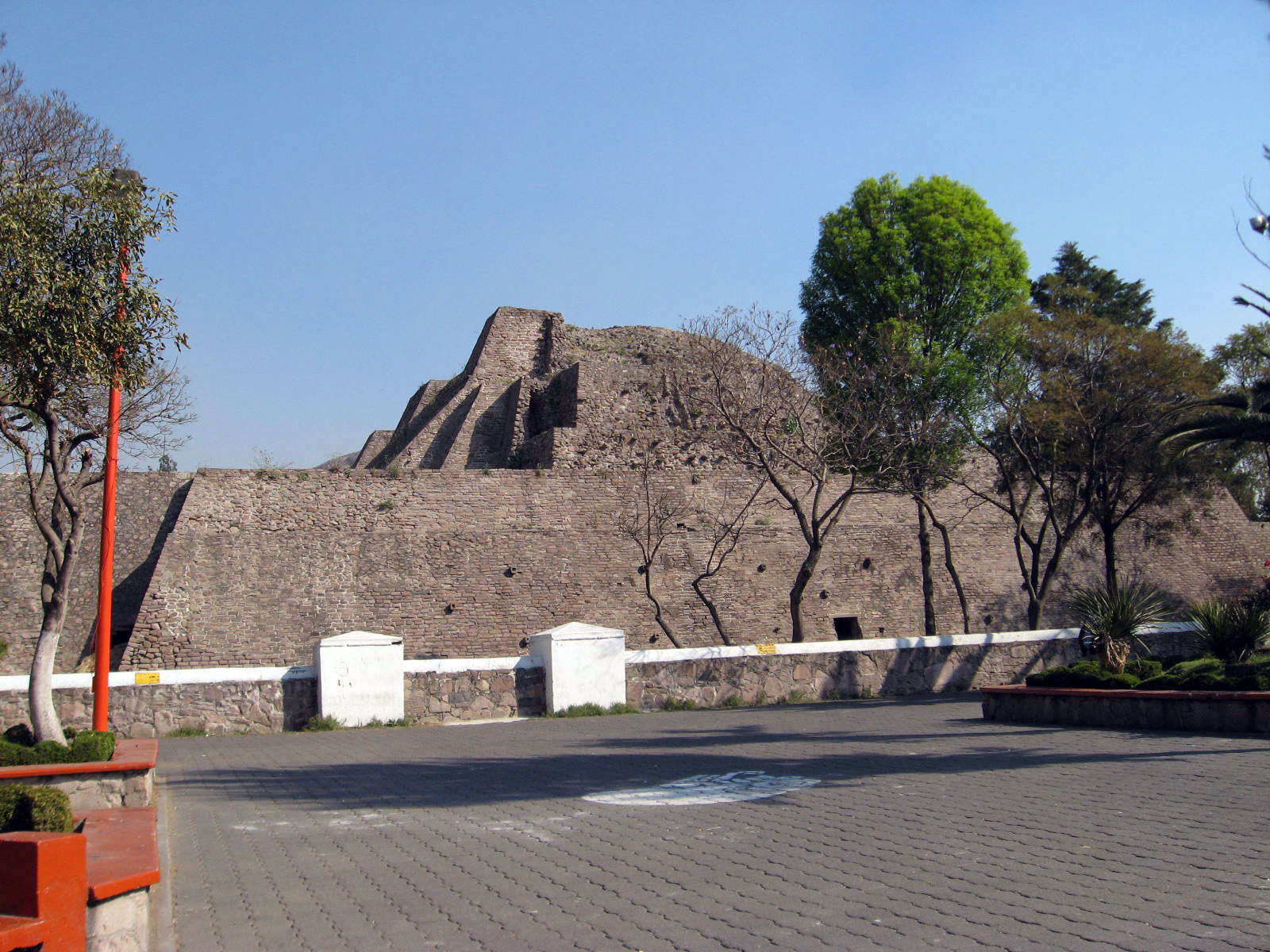
View of pyramids north side

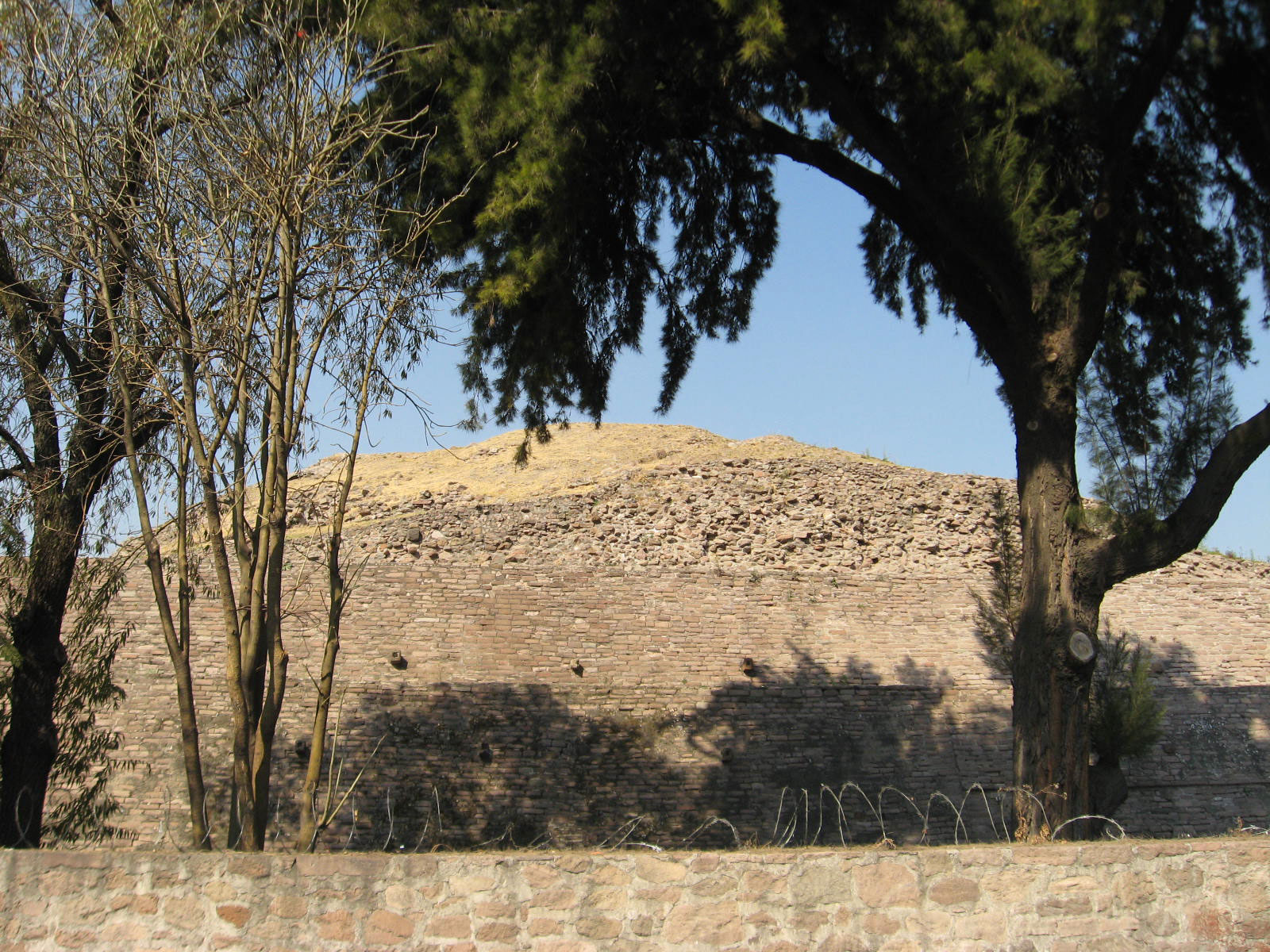
East side of pyramid

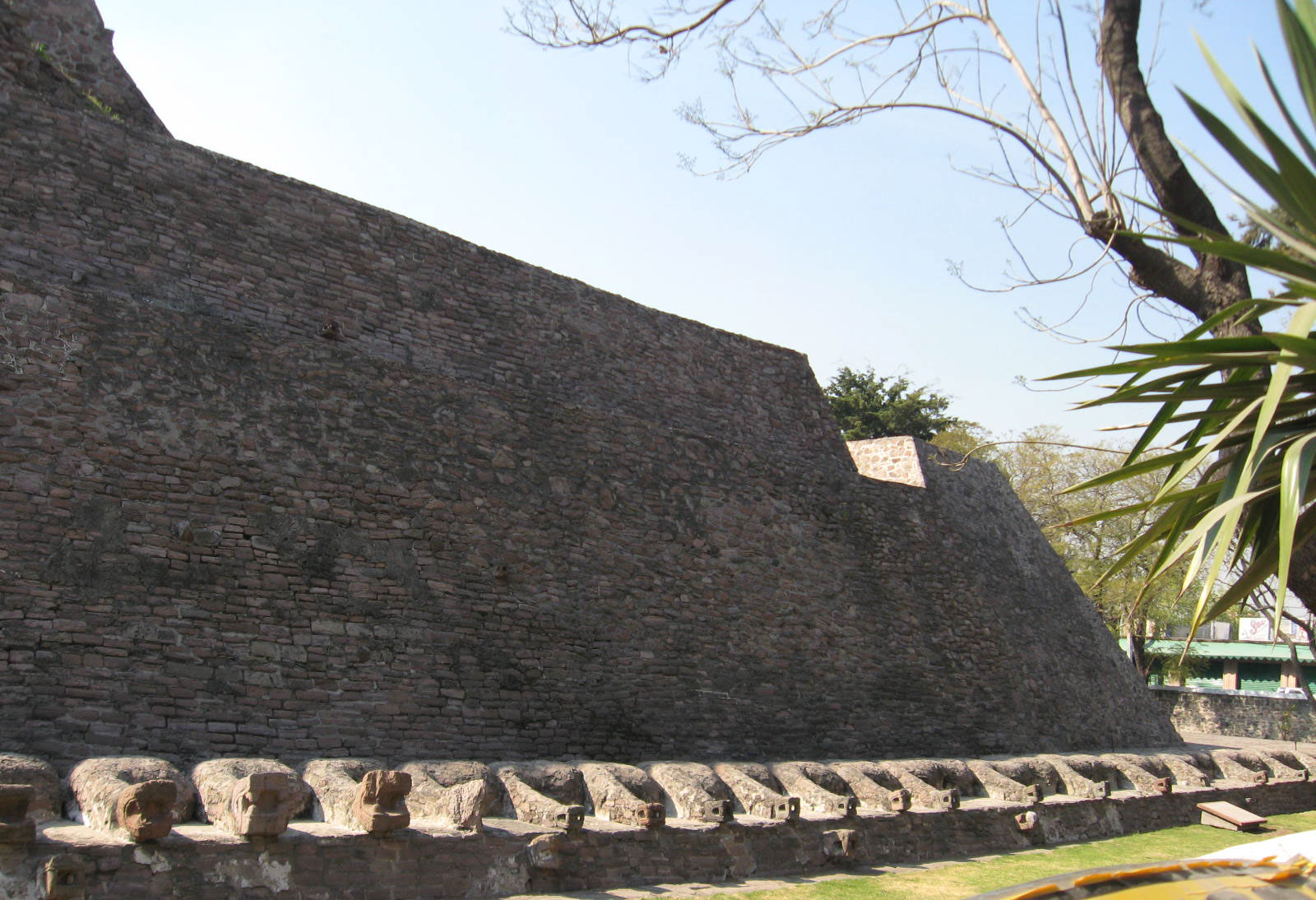
Section of serpent wall or coatepantli on the northwest side of pyramid

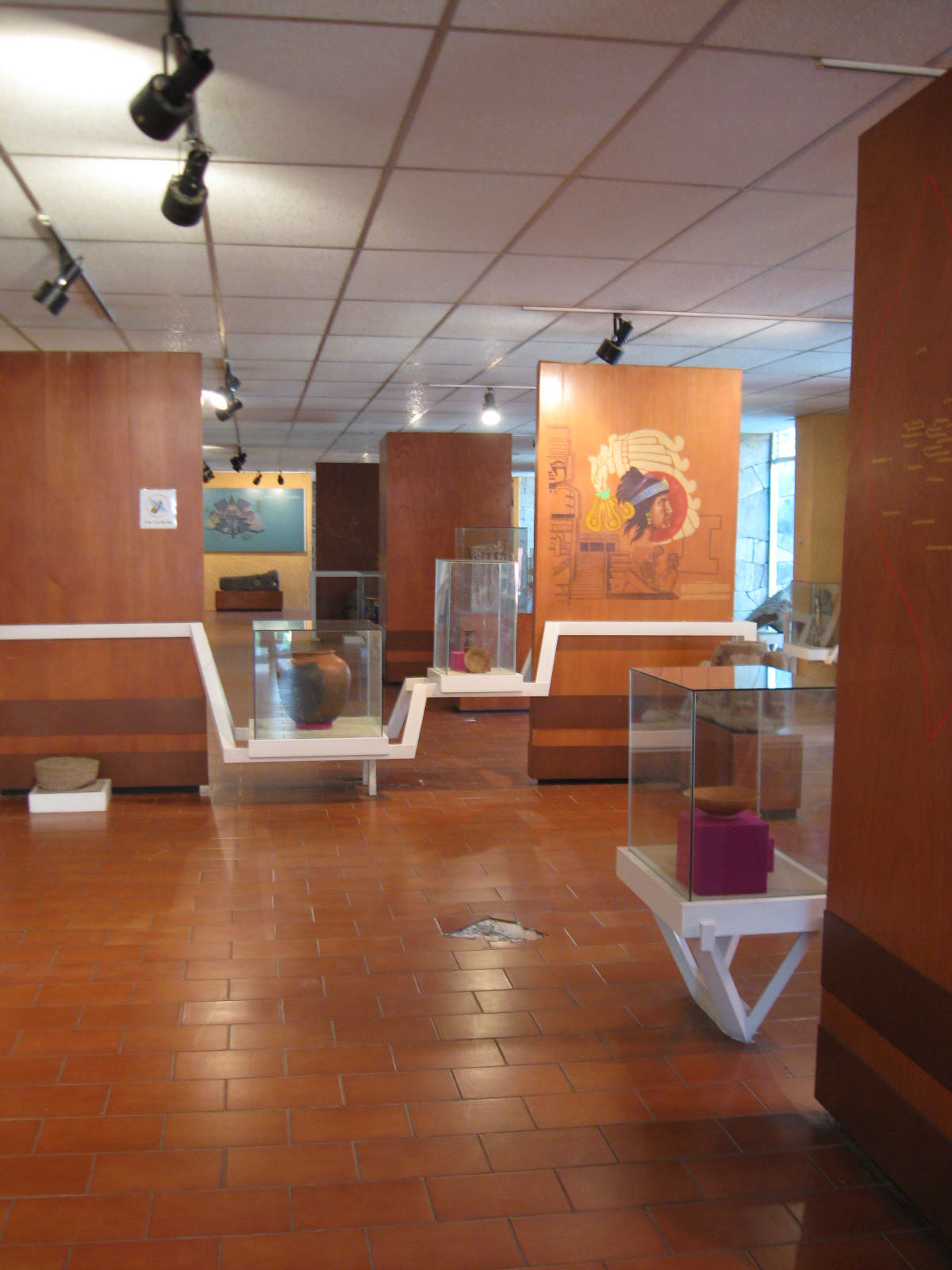
Inside of pyramid museum

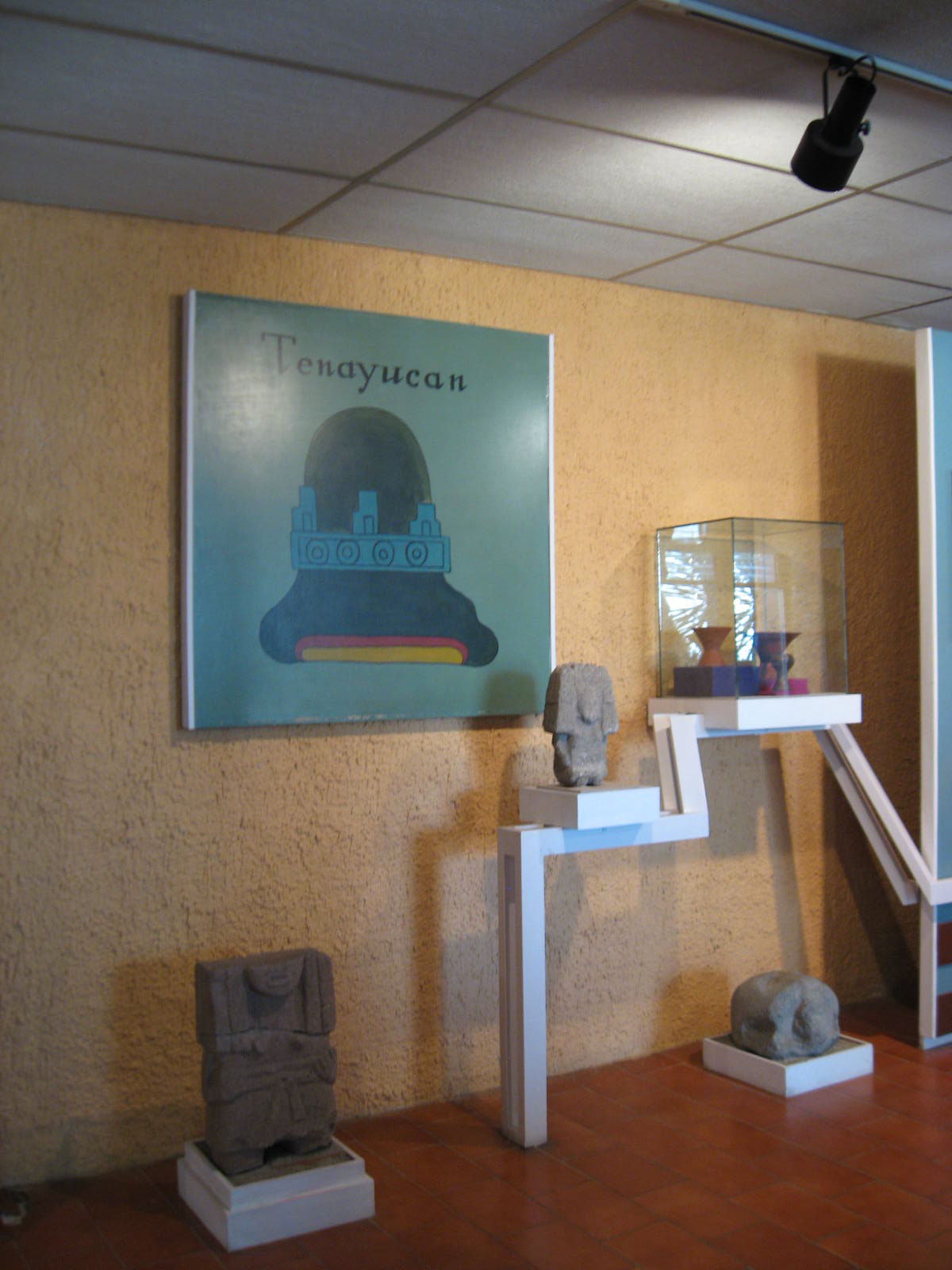
Museum exhibit of settlements glyph

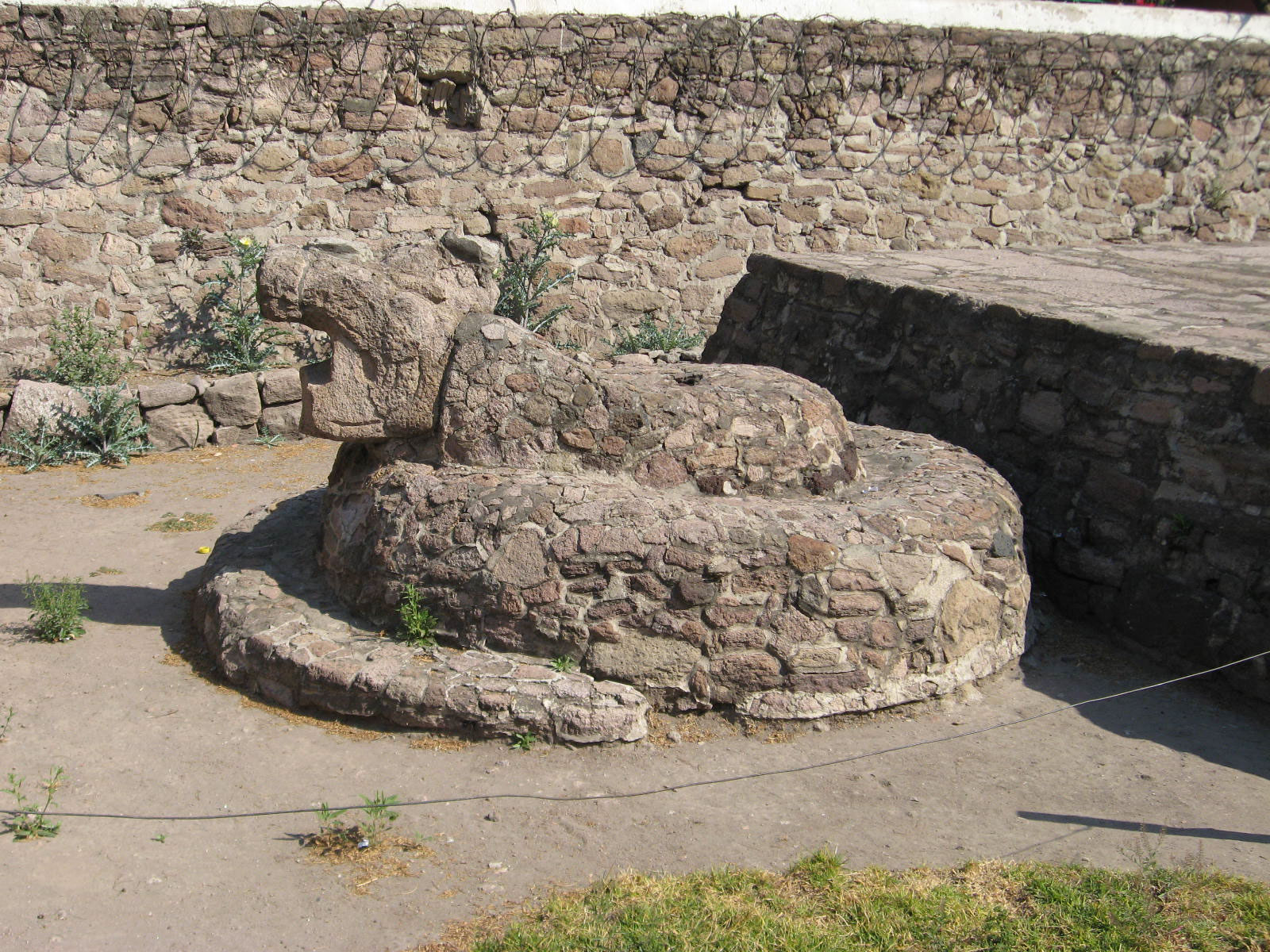
Coiled snake sculpture at north altar

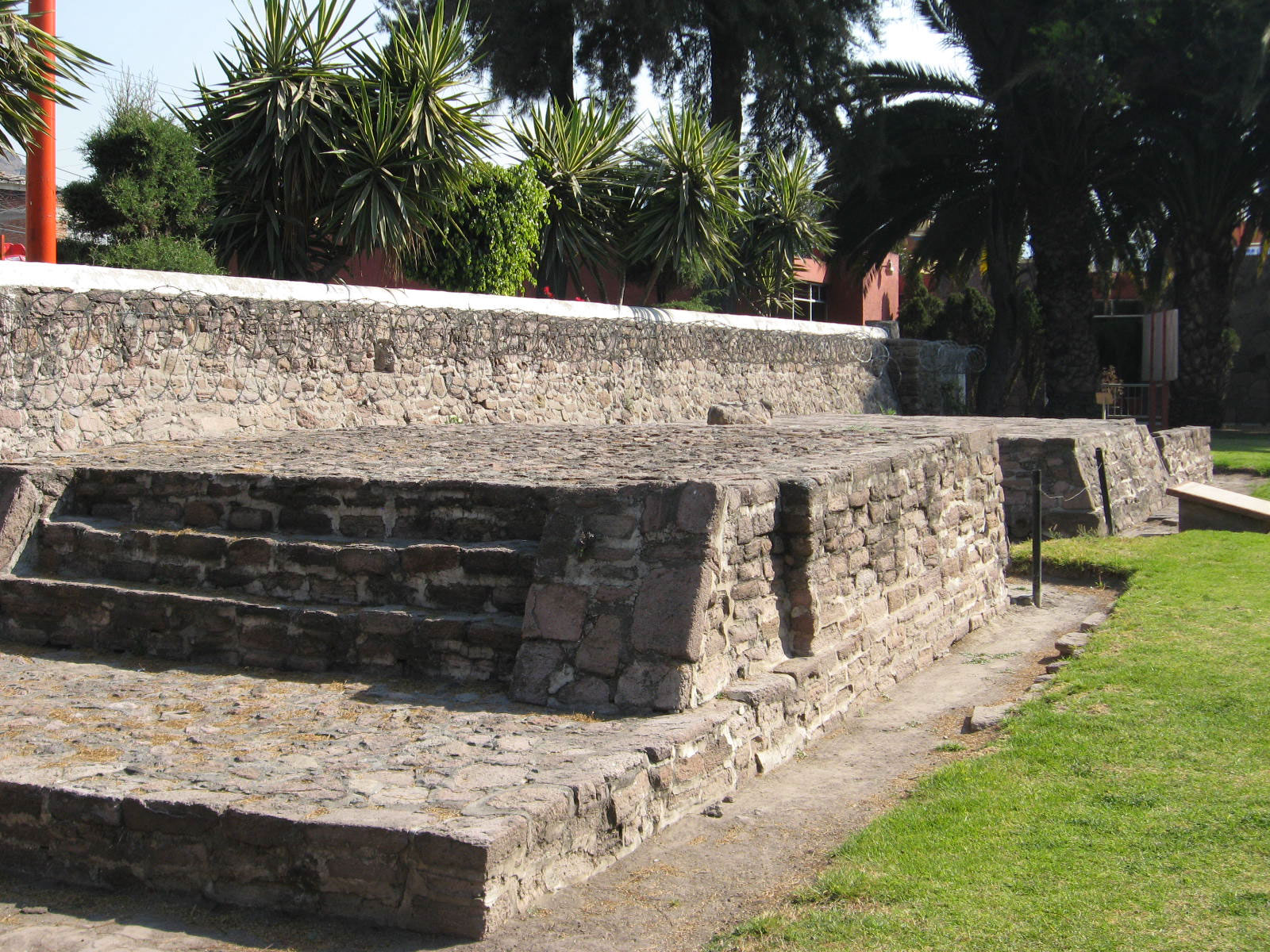
North altar to the side of the pyramid. The snake sculpture is between the two platforms

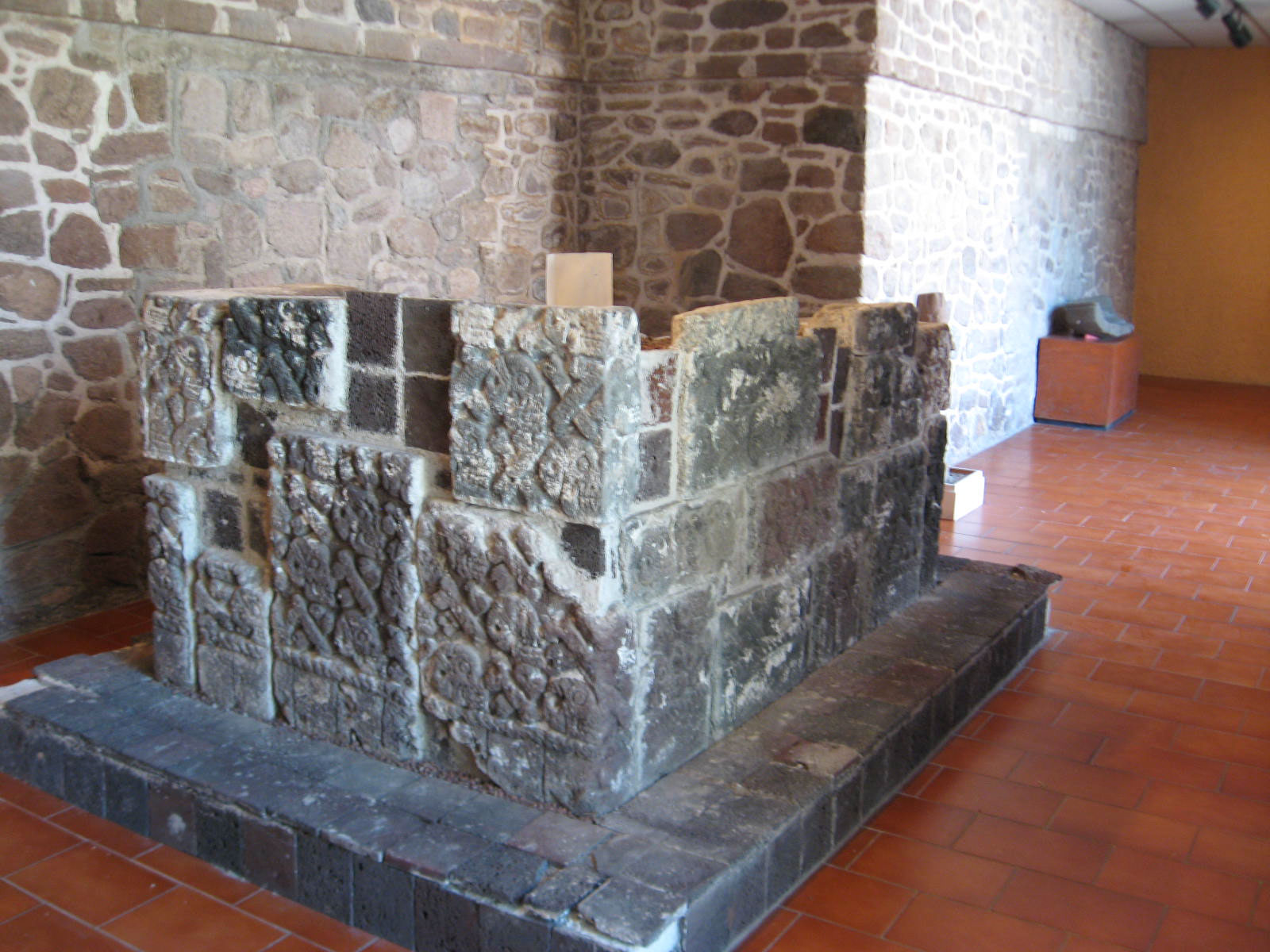
This altar, decorated with skulls and crossed bones was found in the pyramids base with human bone fragments remaining

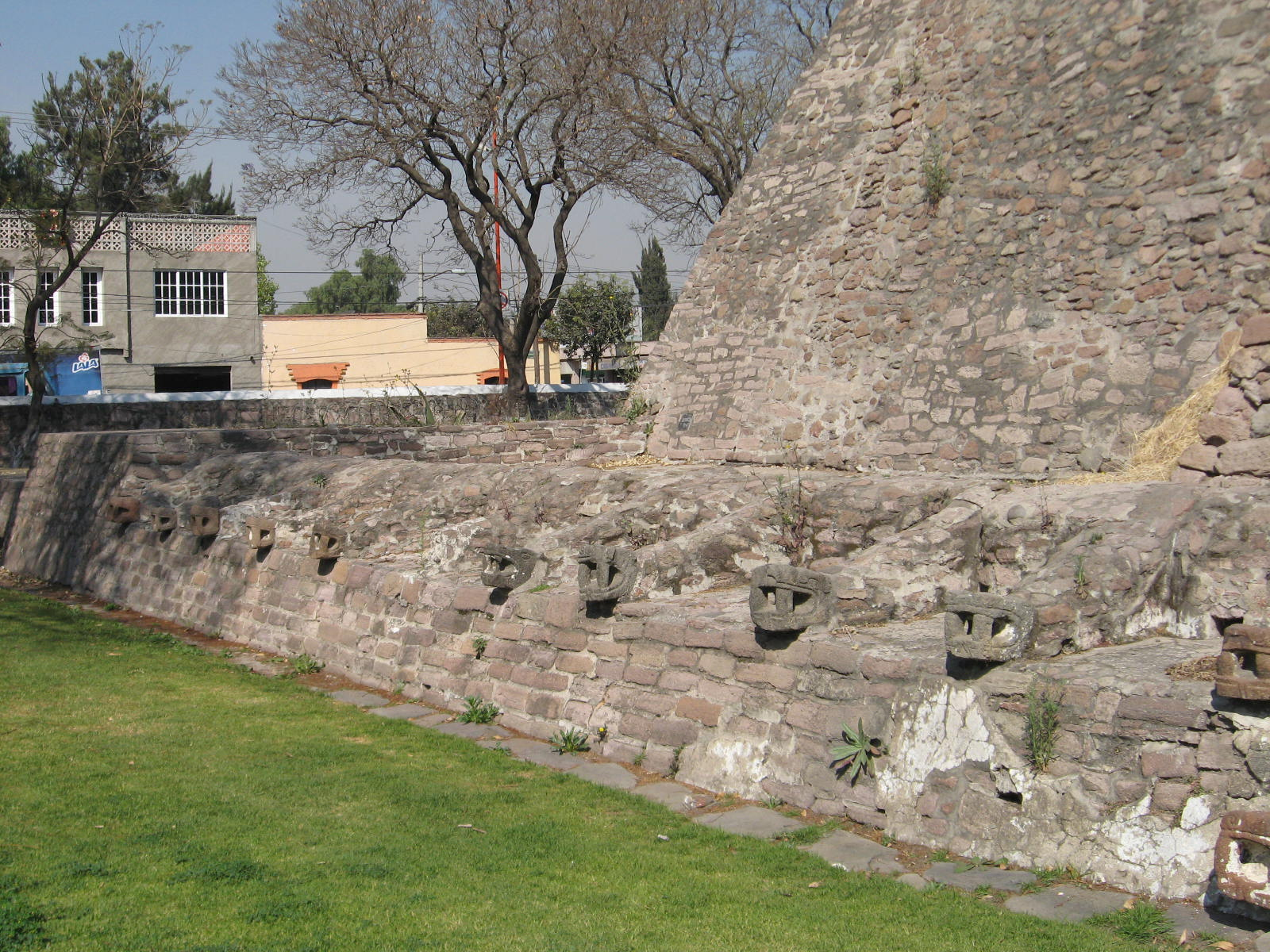
Southwest portion of the coatepantli

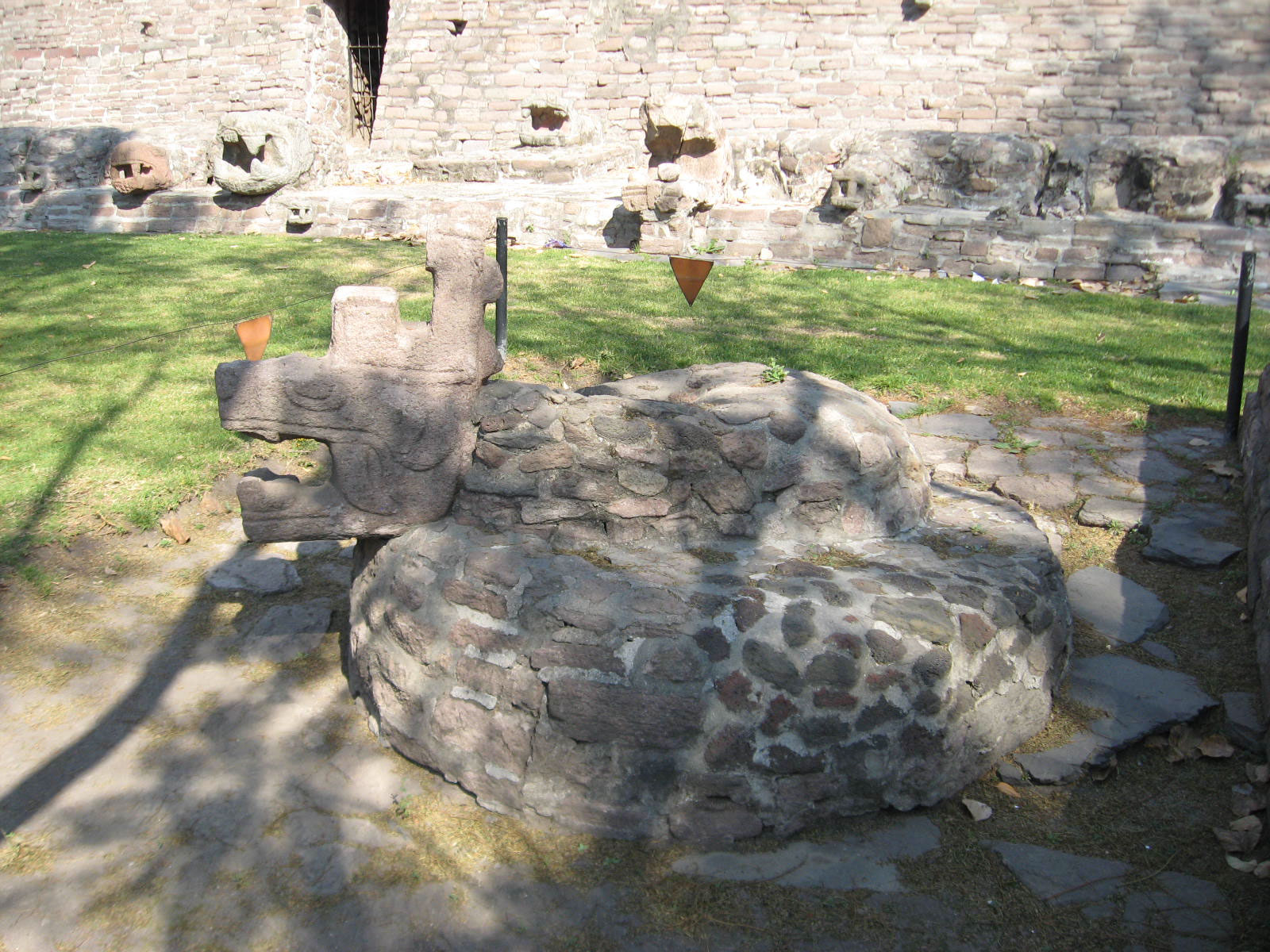
Coiled serpent on south side of pyramid

== See also ==
- Aztecs
- Teopanzolco
- Tlatelolco (archaeological site)
- List of Mesoamerican pyramids
