= Zacatecas (city) =

City in Zacatecas, Mexico

- City and municipality
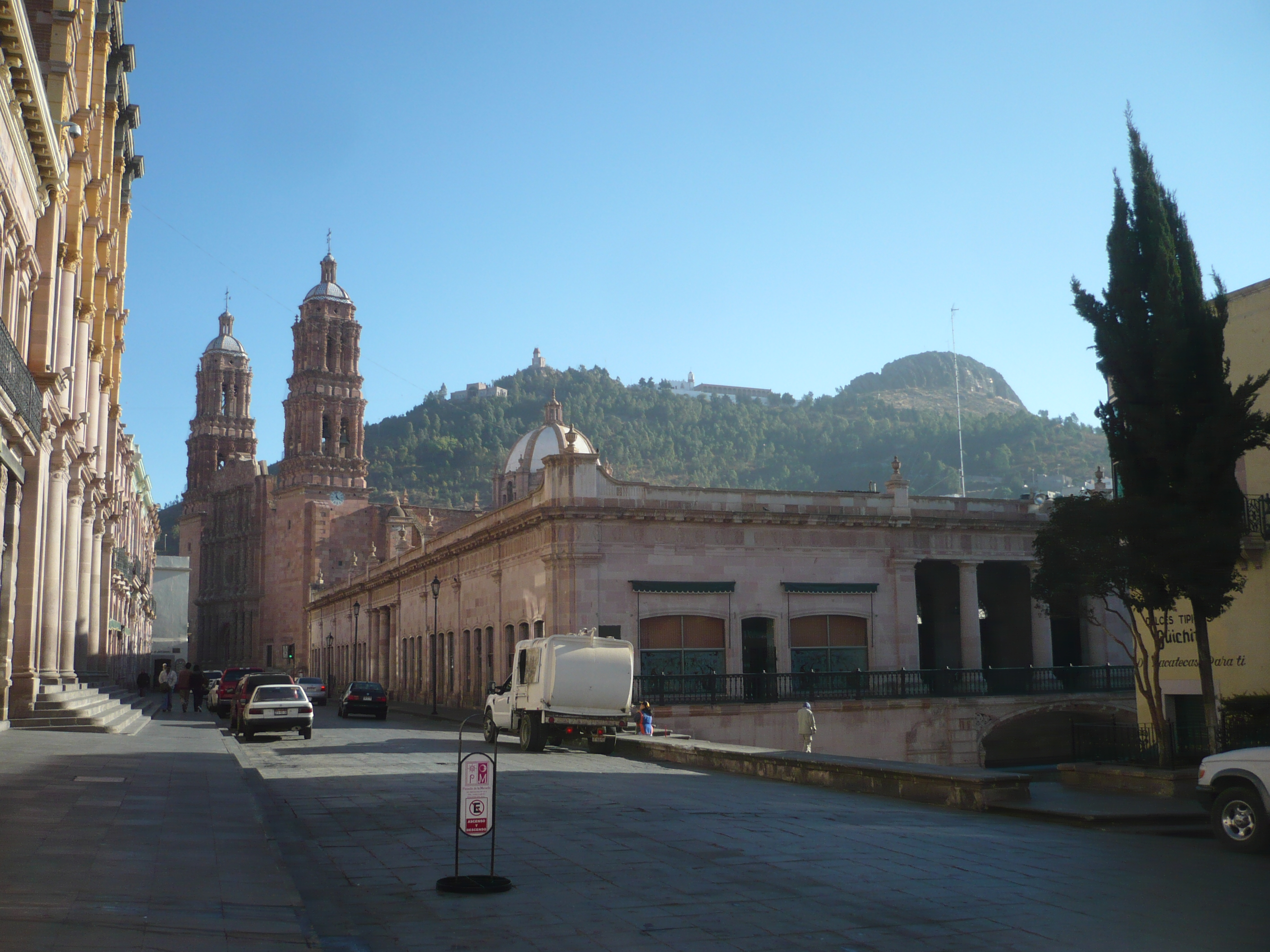
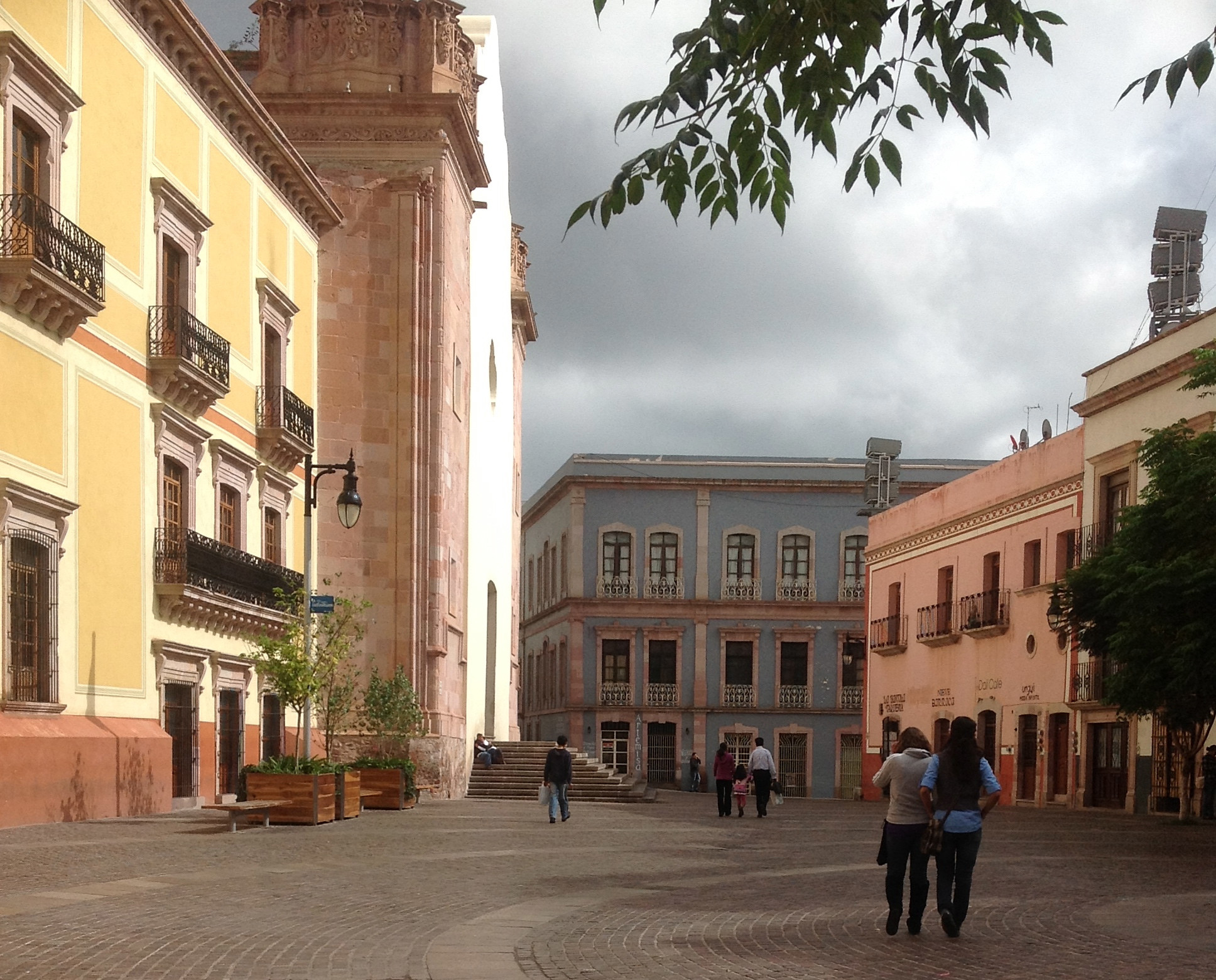
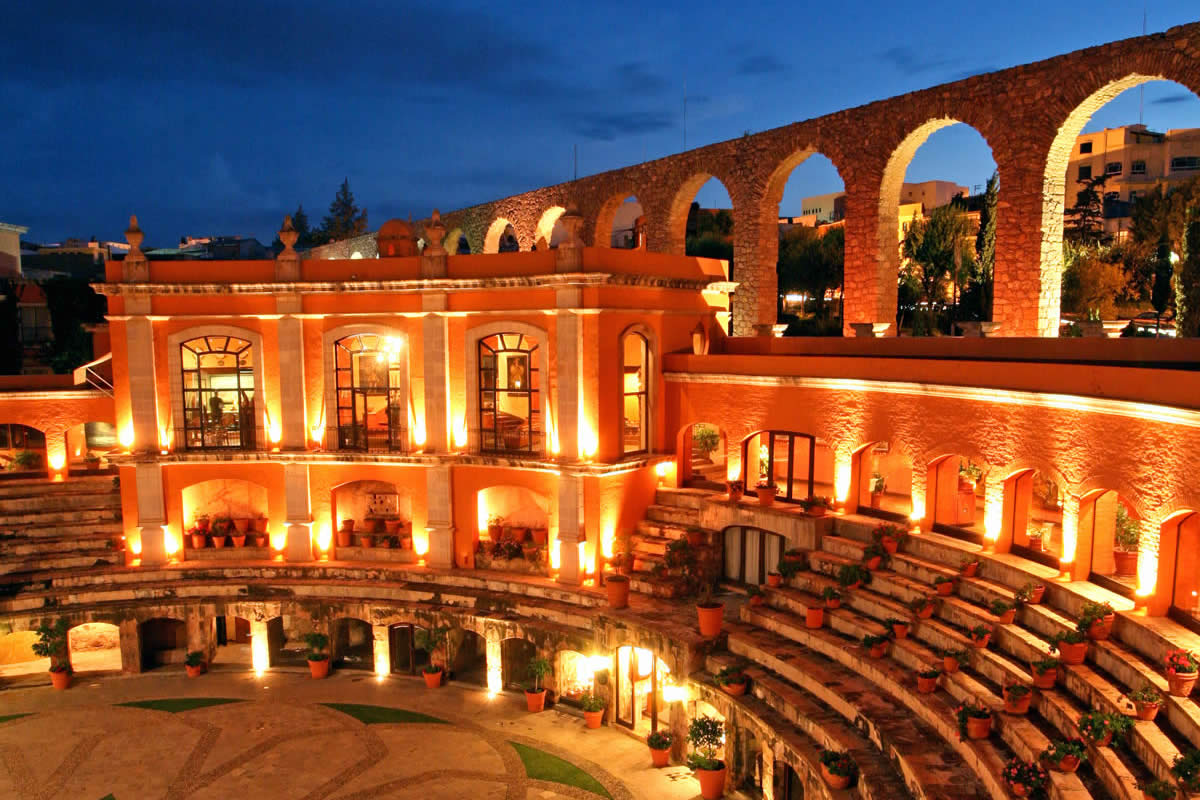
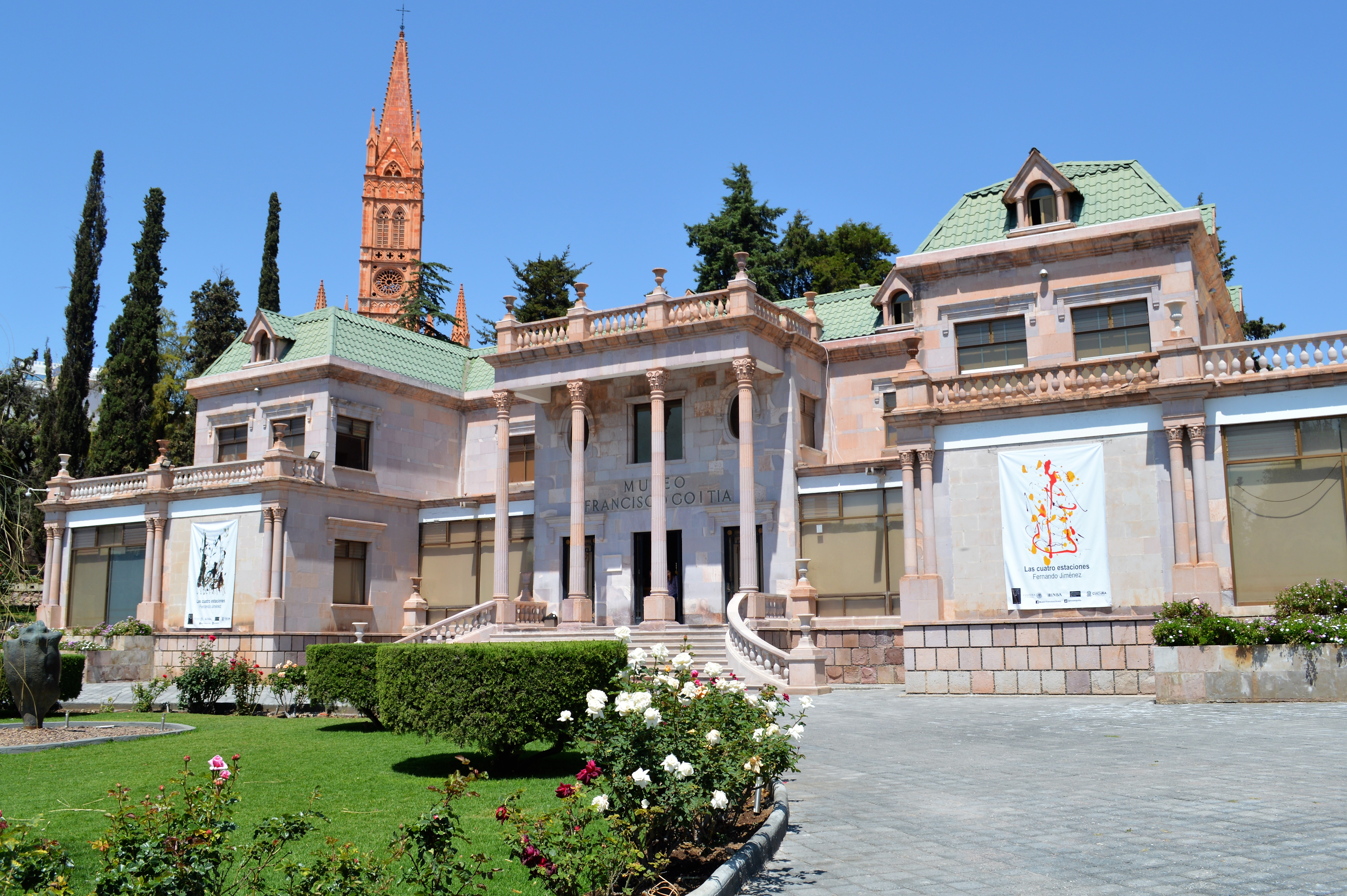
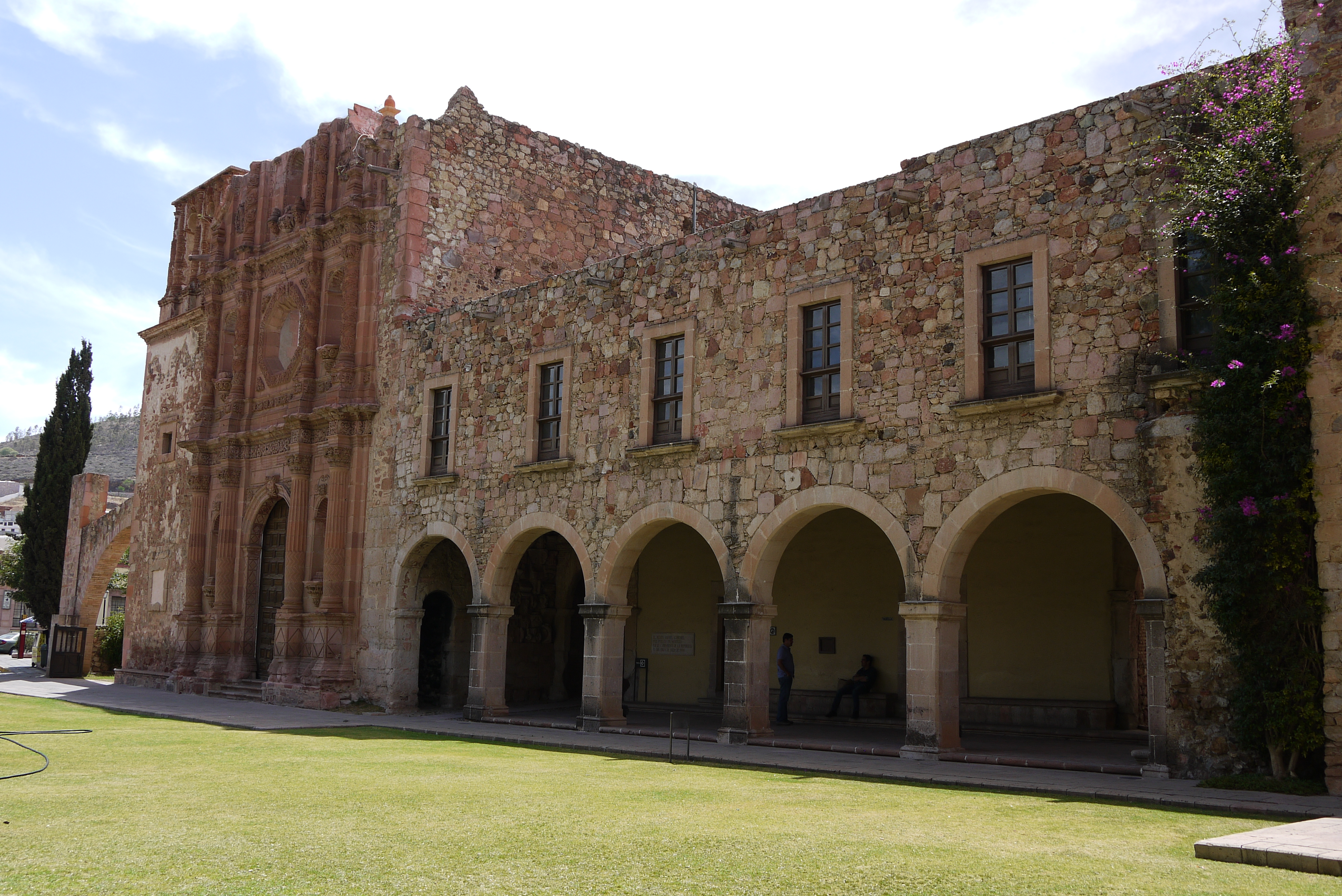
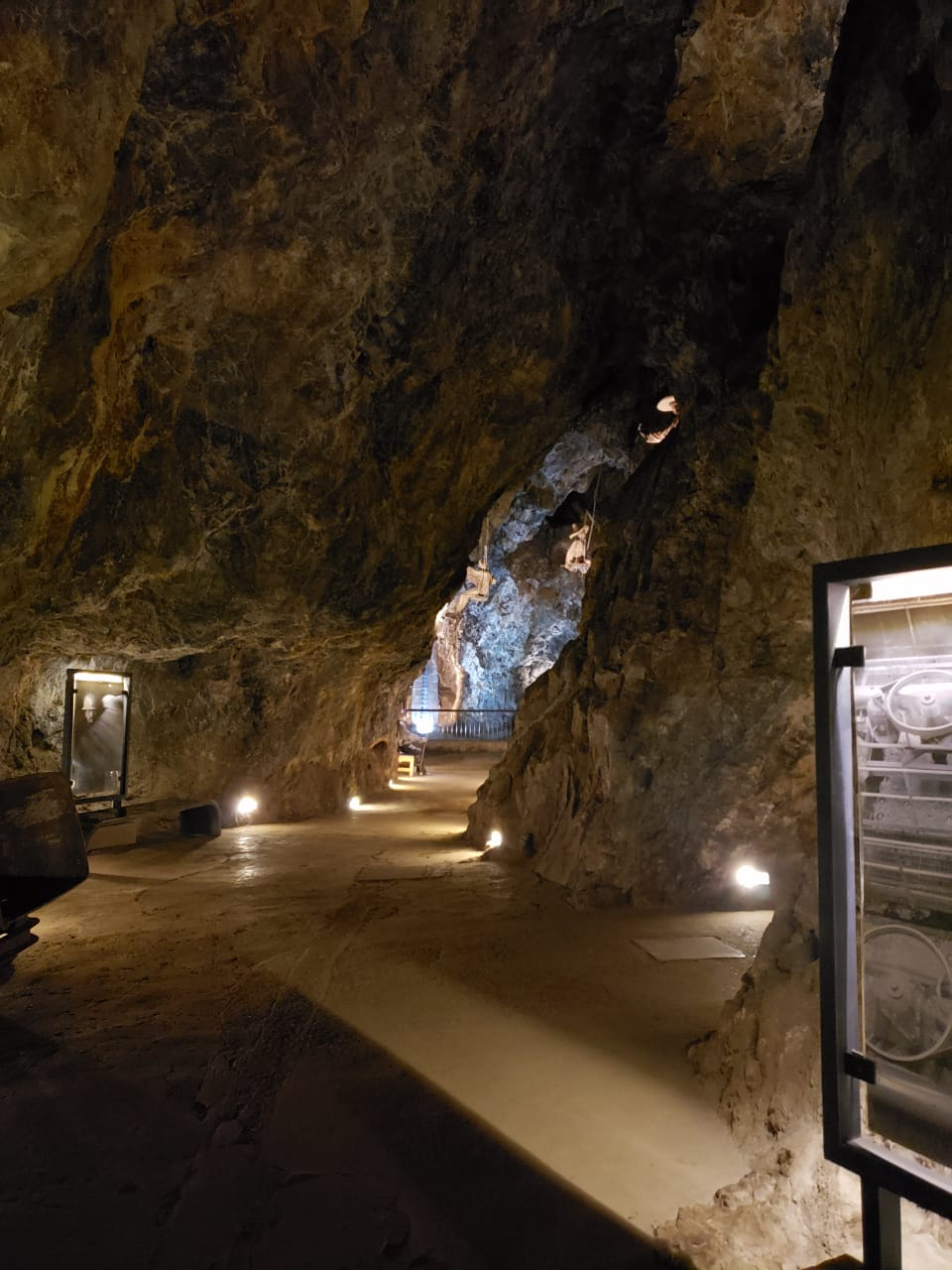
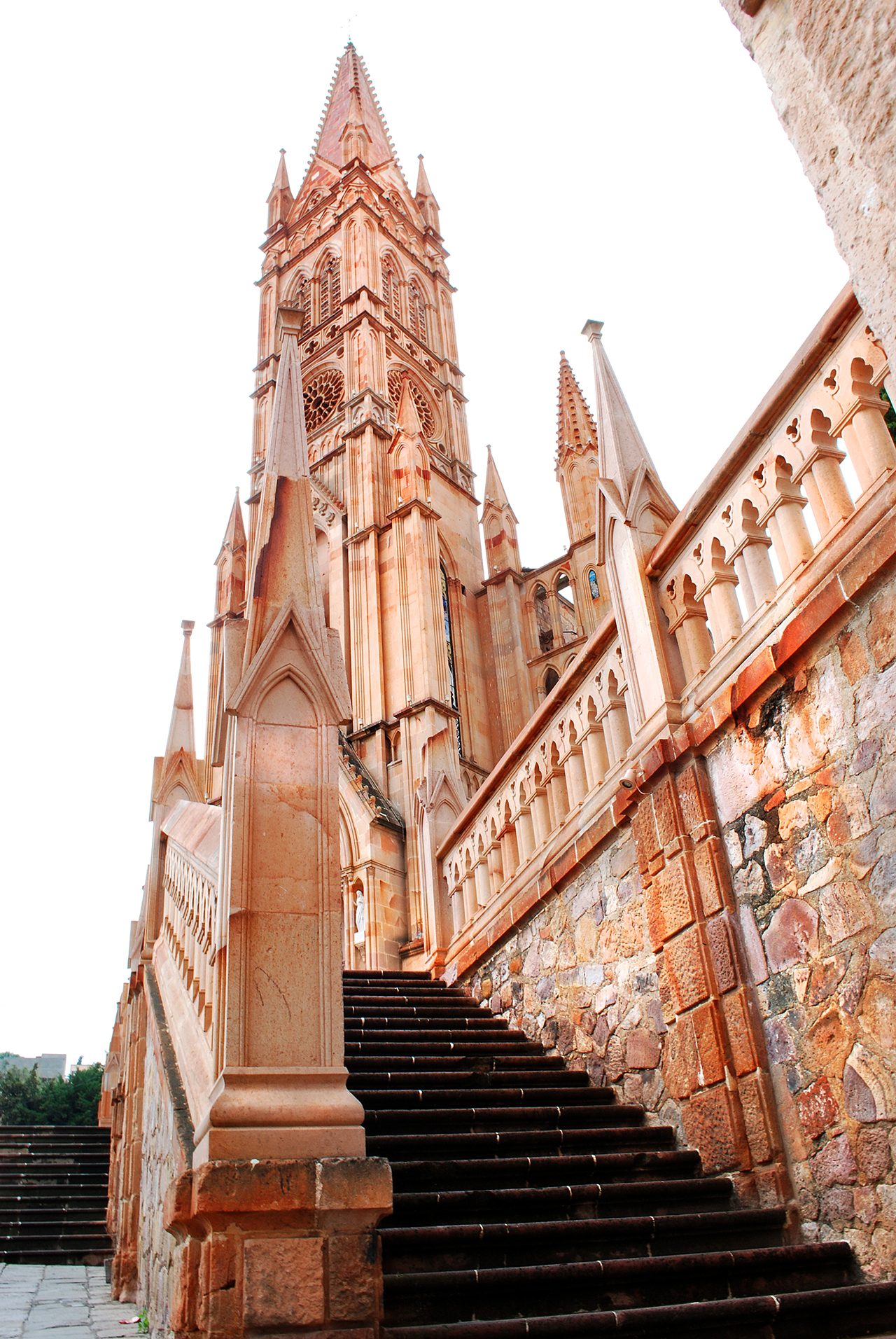
- Cathedral of Zacatecas and main street Miguel Auza Square Quinta Real and aqueduct Francisco Goitia Museum St. Francis Monastery (now Rafael Coronel Museum) El Edén Mine Church of Our Lady of Fátima

- Coat of arms
- Nicknames: Civilizadora del Norte; Ciudad de Cantera; Corazón de Plata
- Location within Zacatecas Location within Mexico
- Coordinates: 22°46′25″N 102°34′25″W
- Country: Mexico
- State: Zacatecas
- Founded: 1548
- Municipal Status: 1825

Government
  - Municipal President: Miguel Ángel Varela Pinedo (2024-2027) (PAN)

Area
  - Municipality: 356.14 km^{2} (137.51 sq mi)
- Elevation (of seat): 2,440 m (8,010 ft)

Population (2020)
  - Municipality: 138,444
  - Density: 388.73/km^{2} (1,006.8/sq mi)
  - Municipality: 149,607
- Time zone: UTC−06:00 (Zona Centro)
- Postal code (of seat): 98000
- Area code: 492
- Website: (in Spanish) /Official site

UNESCO World Heritage Site
- Official name: Historic Centre of Zacatecas
- Type: Cultural
- Criteria: II, IV
- Designated: 1993 (17th session)
- Reference no.: 676
- Region: Latin America and the Caribbean

Zacatecas (Spanish pronunciation: [sakaˈtekas]) is the principal city within the municipality in Mexico of the same name, and the capital of the state of Zacatecas. Located in north-central Mexico, the city had its start as a Spanish mining camp in the mid-16th century. Native Americans had already known about the area's rich deposits of silver and other minerals. Due to the wealth that the mines provided, Zacatecas quickly became one of the most important mining cities in New Spain. The area saw battles during the turbulent 19th century, but the next major event was the Battle of Zacatecas during the Mexican Revolution when Francisco Villa captured the town, an event still celebrated every anniversary. Today, the colonial part of the city is a World Heritage Site, due to the Baroque and other structures built during its mining days. Mining still remains an important industry. The name Zacatecas is derived from the Zacateco people and has its roots in Nahuatl. The name means "people of the grasslands".

== History ==
=== Indigenous peoples ===
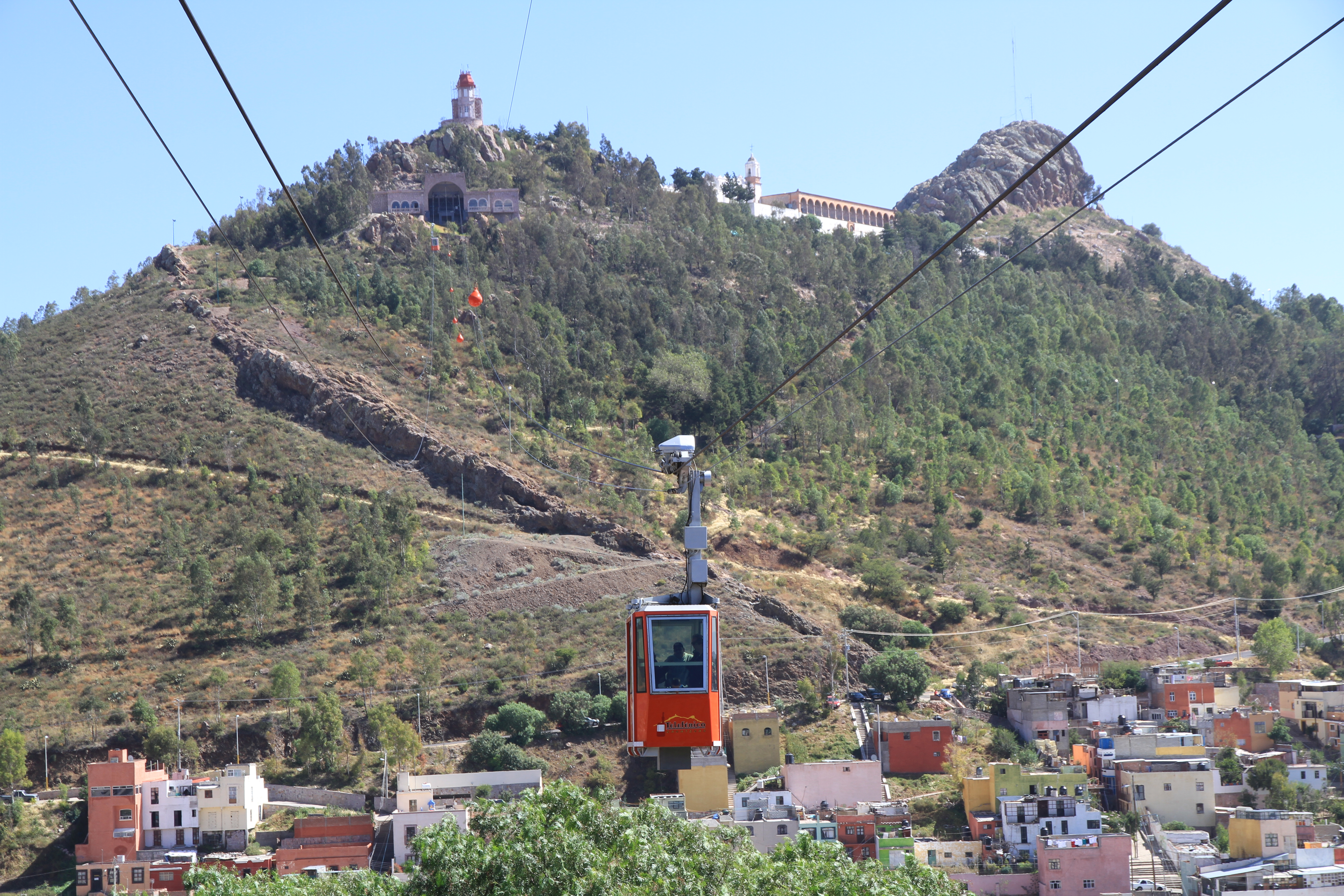
Bufa Hill (Spanish: Cerro de la Bufa), viewpoint of the Zacatecos

The first people to populate the area arrived approximately 10,000 years ago, when the climate was wetter and warmer, with different vegetation and wildlife. Eventually, the area came to be dominated by Chichimeca tribes such as the Caxcans, Guachichils, Guamares, Huichols, Zacatecos and others, with the Zacatecos being the most numerous in the area of the city today. These peoples were mining silver and other metals in the hills long before the Europeans arrived, making the area important in pre-Columbian times.

=== Colonial period ===
The Spanish came to the Zacatecas area via Guadalajara. In 1540, Nuño de Guzmán traveled from Mexico City conquering what are now the states of Michoacán and Jalisco. One of Guzmán's lieutenants, Cristóbal de Oñate, conquered the area around what is now Guadalajara. Another, Pedro Almindes Chirinos Peralmindes, went to explore the lands to the north, taking Zacatecas with little trouble but not knowing of the riches underneath the soil. And the area initially was simply frontier. Other expeditions followed, including one by Juan de Tolosa in 1546, who brought back rock samples from Cerro de la Bufa, which were determined to contain high concentrations of silver and lead. A mining camp was soon established at the foot of Cerro de la Bufa. The Zacatecos initially fought the permanent presence of the Spanish, but the mining potential of the area strengthened the Europeans' resolve and the natives were defeated in the 1540s. Surveys of the other surrounding hills were undertaken by Tolosa, Diego de Ibarra, Baltasar Temiño de Bañuelos, Andrés de Villanueva and others.

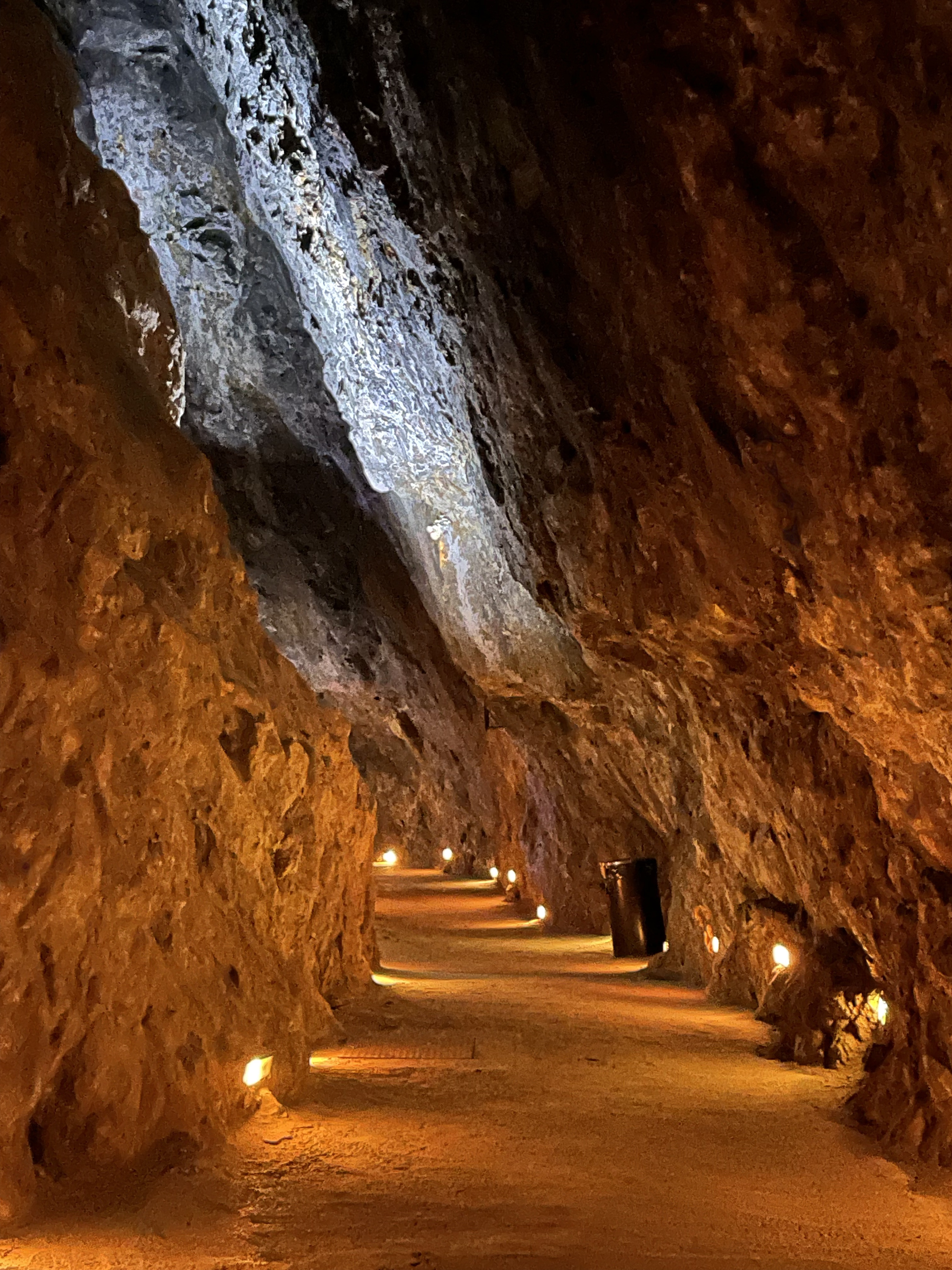
El Edén Mine

A military mining camp was formally established in 1548 and called Minas de Nuestra Señora de Remedios. The first major vein of silver was found in 1548 in a mine called San Bernabé. This was followed by similar finds in mines called Albarrada de San Benito, Vetagrande, Pánuco and others. This brought a large number of people to Zacatecas, including craftsmen, merchants, clerics and adventurers. In 1550, royalty found its way to Zacatecas in the person of Leonor Cortés Moctezuma, the illegitimate daughter of conquistador Hernán Cortés and Isabel Moctezuma, daughter of the Aztec emperor. Doña Leonor married Juan de Tolosa. The settlement grew over the space of a few years into one of the most important cities in New Spain and the most populous after Mexico City. The camp became a parish in 1550, in 1585, then it was declared a city with the name of "Muy Noble y Leal Ciudad de Nuestra Señora de Zacatecas" (Very Noble and Loyal City of Our Lady of Zacatecas), receiving its coat of arms from Philip II of Spain at the same time. The success of the mines led to the arrival of indigenous people and the importation of black slaves to work in them. The mining camp spread southwards along the course of the Arroyo de la Plata, which now lies underneath Hidalgo Avenue, the old town's main road. Tall buildings were constructed along here due to the lack of flat area on which to build. The first house was supposedly built in 1547, just before the fortress and metal foundry. Hospitals and hospices were built in the 1550s.

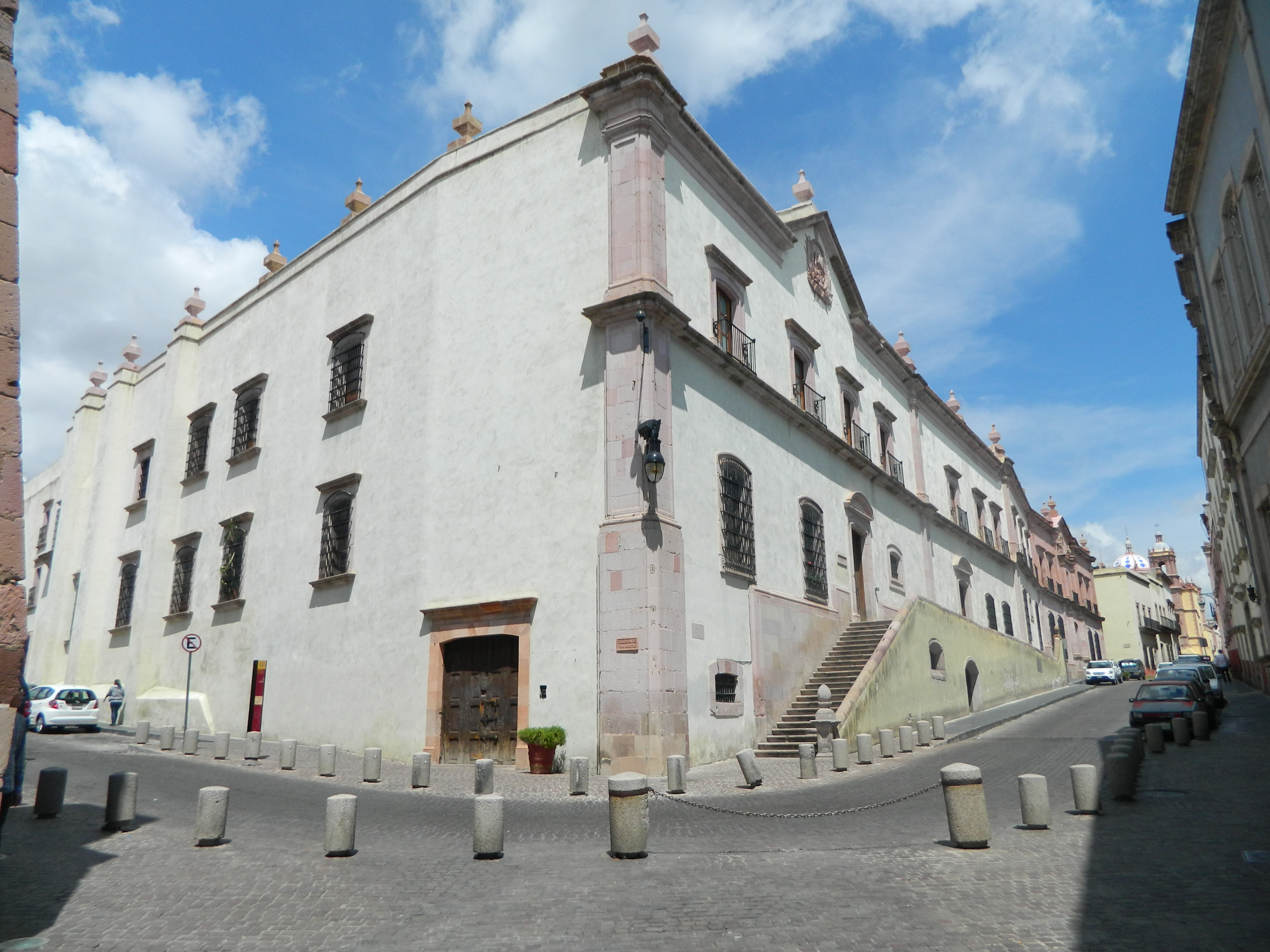
Former city mint.

Zacatecas was one of the richest states in Mexico. One of the most important mines from the colonial period is the El Edén mine. It began operations in 1586 in the Cerro de la Bufa. It principally produced gold and silver with most of its production occurring in the 17th and 18th centuries. Today, the opening of this mine is within the city limits and was closed to mining in 1960. It was reopened as a tourist attraction in 1975. By the end of the 16th century, the city was the second most important, after Mexico City, and the income its mines produced for the Spanish Crown made it one of the most powerful in Europe. Its importance was not only due to mining. Most of the mendicant religious orders in New Spain eventually established monasteries, making Zacatecas an important center for evangelization. The Franciscans arrived in 1558, the Augustinians in 1576 and the Dominicans in 1604. Many of the missionary expeditions to what are now California and Texas came from this city.

Over the rest of the colonial period, the riches from the ground financed the building of important religious and secular constructions. The peak of this construction occurred in the 18th century. One of these constructions is the Colegio de San Luis Gonzaga, which was established in 1796.

=== Mexican War of Independence ===
Ignacio López Rayón led a group of Mexican rebels capturing the city of Zacatecas on April 15, 1811, early in the fight for Mexican independence from Spain. Víctor Rosales and José María Cos were leaders of Hidalgo's rebellion. Shortly after Independence, the Mexican government established the city of Zacatecas as the capital of the newly formed state of Zacatecas.

=== 19th century ===
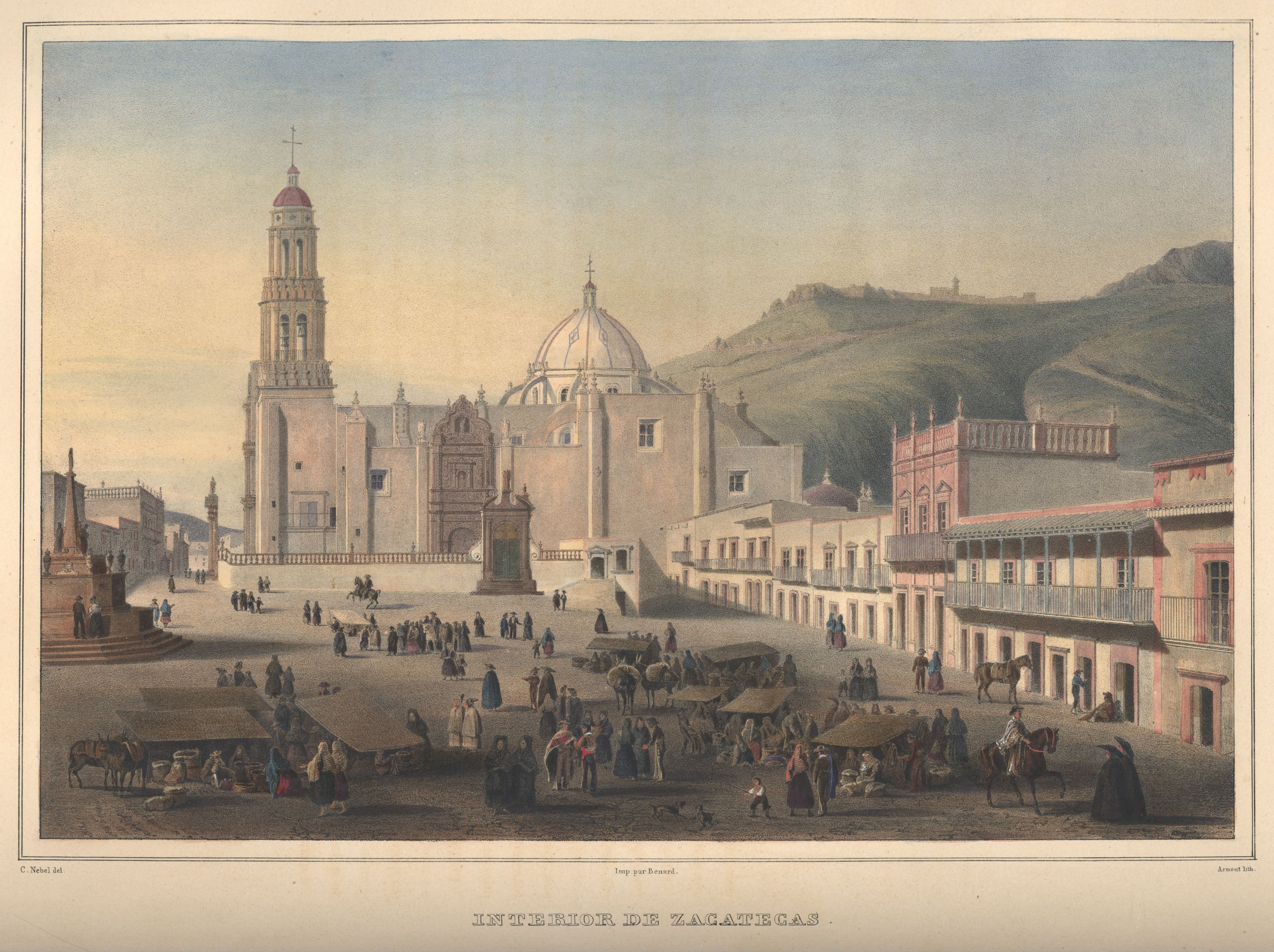
Interior of Zacatecas, painting of 1836 by Carl Nebel

In the mid-1820s, institutions such as the first opera house, first teachers' college, the state treasury, the state supreme court and other institutions were founded in the city when the first state constitution was signed. The first newspaper in the state started circulation herein 1825. The municipality was established in 1825.

From the end of the War of Independence until nearly the end of the 19th century, liberals or federalists and conservatives, who favored centralized rule from Mexico City, battled for control of Zacatecas. In 1835, then-liberal Antonio López de Santa Anna defeated the troops of Francisco Garcia Salinas. During the Reform War, the city was taken by conservative general Miguel Miramón.

The first railroad connecting Zacatecas with Guadalupe was completed in 1880. Connections with Mexico City and El Paso by rail were established in 1884.

=== Mexican Revolution ===
During the Mexican Revolution, Zacatecas was the scene of the Battle of Zacatecas in 1914, pitting the rebel forces of Francisco Villa against the government forces of Victoriano Huerta. Zacatecas was the last stronghold of the Huerta forces, which the División del Norte arrived on June 19, 1914, from Torreón.

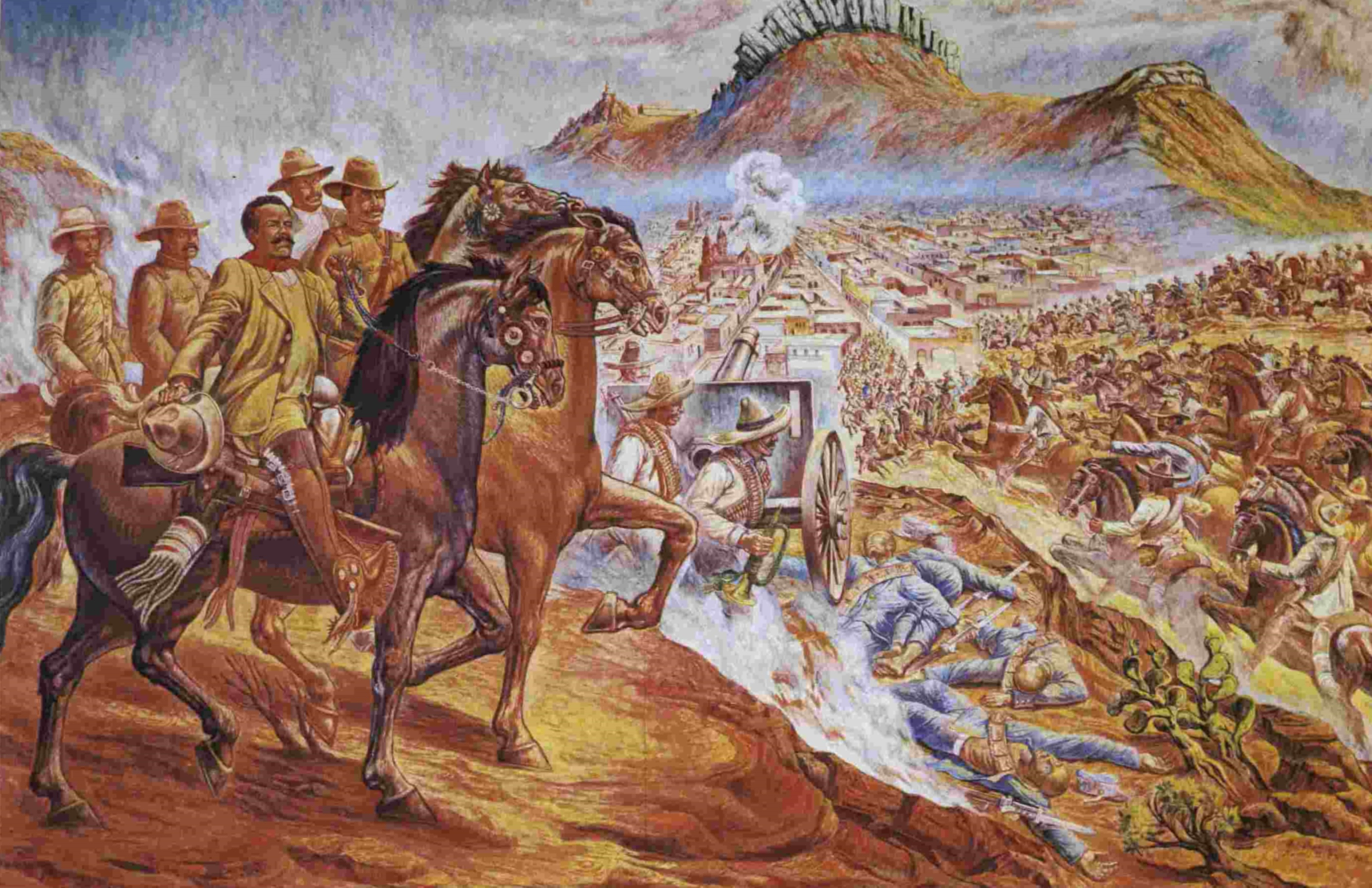
Painting of the Toma de Zacatecas, Chapultepec Castle, Mexico City.

Taking the city would clear the way for Villa to proceed to Mexico City. Villa's forces were under the direct command of General Felipe Ángeles, and Huerta's forces were under the command of General Luis Medina Barrón. From the 19th to the 23rd, General Medina used a light beacon brought from the port city of Veracruz to light the hills at night looking for rebel positions. The battle began at 10:00 a.m. on the 23rd with rebel cannon fire. Over 22,000 rebel troops then approached the city from four directions, from the mountains known as La Bufa, La Sierpe, Loreto and La Tierra Negra. The battle continued until about 5:00 that afternoon, when Huerta's troops began to abandon their positions, and the División del Norte took the strategic hills of La Bufa and El Grillo, entering the city. The rebels sacked the city and destroyed a number of buildings. Battle casualties were about 5,000 for Huerta's troops and about 3,000 for the rebels. After the Mexican Revolution, the city of Zacatecas decided to revive the original seal granted to it by Philip II, and make it the seal of both the city and the state. It had been discarded after the War of Independence. The "Marcha Aréchiga" or "Marcha Zacatecas" written by Genaro Codina in the early 20th century, became the semi official anthem of the city and state.

=== 20th century ===
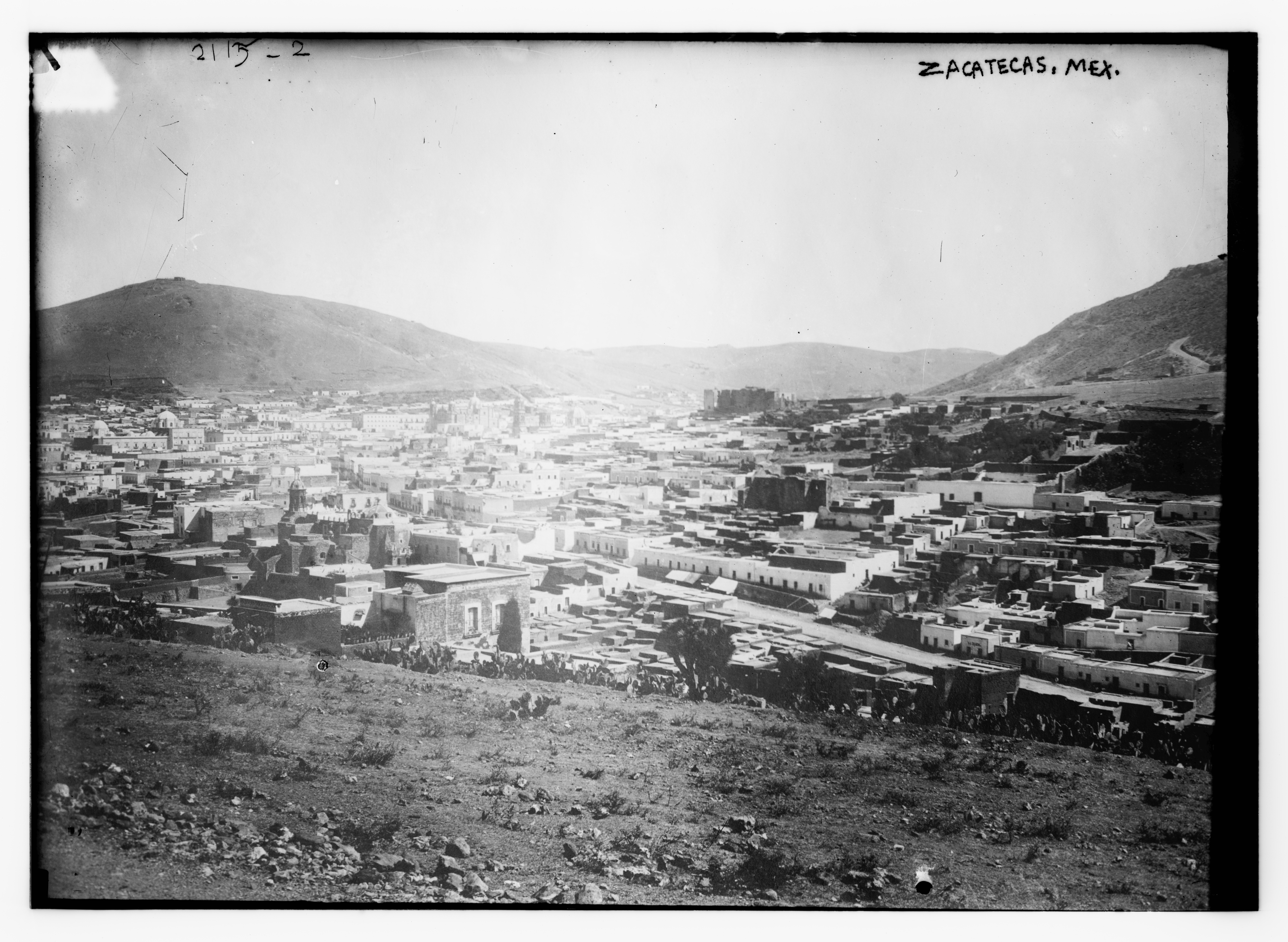
Zacatecas c. 1900.

The old Instituto de Ciencias was refounded as the Universidad Autónoma de Zacatecas in 1968, and an international airport was constructed in 1970.

The anniversary of the city had been celebrated on the day of the Virgin of Zapopan, who was the patron until 1975. Since then the patron has been changed to the Virgin del Patrocinio, who is celebrated on the same day.

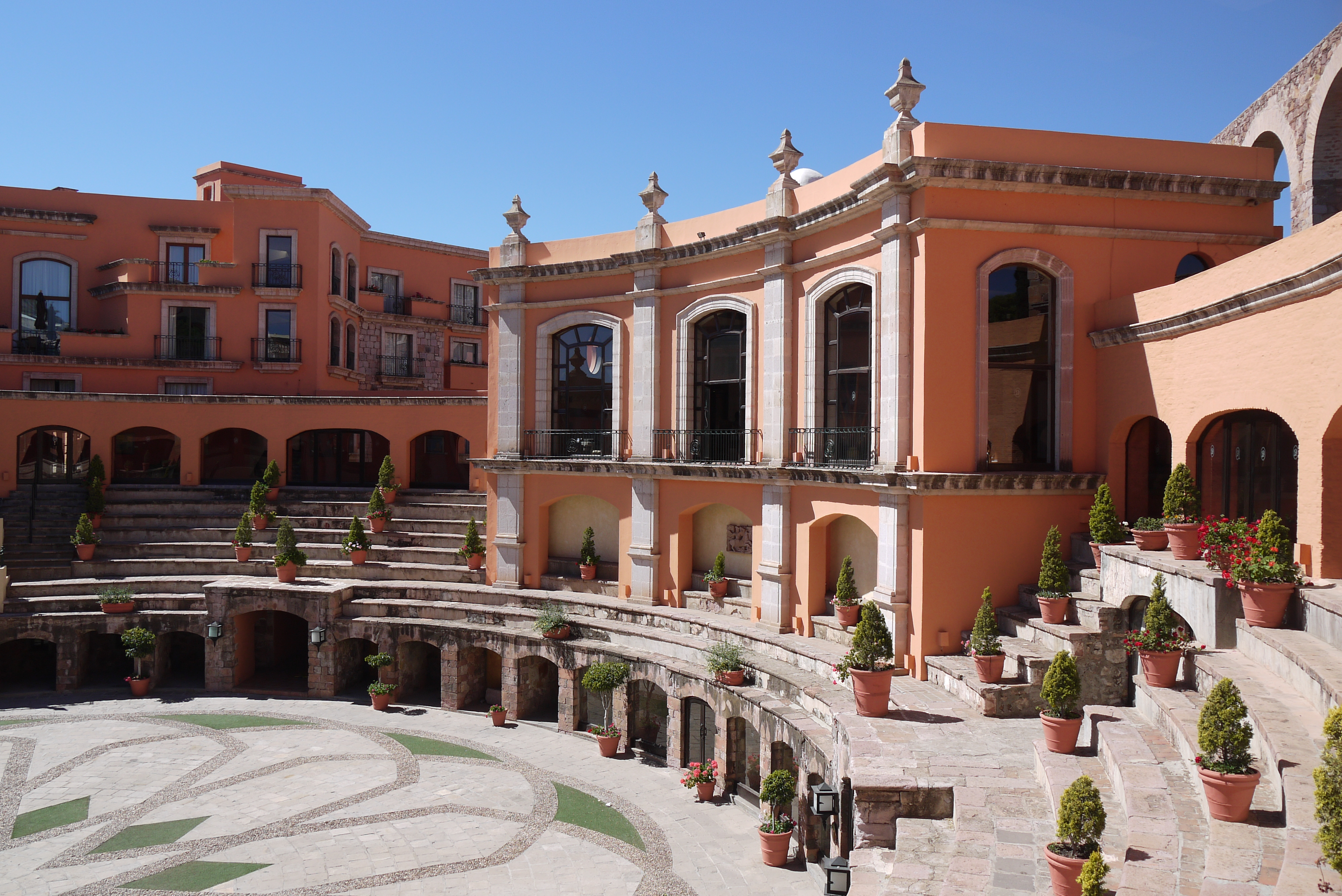
The former Plaza de Toros with El Cubo aqueduct in the background. The bullring was repurposed into a hotel in 1989.

The city center was named a World Heritage Site in 1993. UNESCO's websites states the following as justification. "Founded in 1546 after the discovery of a rich silver lode, Zacatecas reached the height of its prosperity in the 16th and 17th centuries. Built on the steep slopes of a narrow valley, the town has views of the area. There are also several old buildings, both religious and civil. The cathedral, built between 1730 and 1760, dominates downtown. It is notable for its harmonious design and the Baroque profusion of its façades, where European and indigenous decorative elements are found side by side."

Zacatecas has had a number of earthquakes since the colonial period. The last occurred in 1995 and caused minor damage.

=== 21st century ===
In 2009, the city council approved the logotype of the new administration with includes the Virgin of Zacatecas image. However, since then it has been claimed that the new logo violates Article 5 of the Zacatecas constitution and Article 10 of a law called Bando de Policía y Buen Gobierno. Another objection is that the new seal contains the colors yellow and black, those of the political party of the municipal president. The city has grown to the point where houses now balance on the edge of a creek and over the mounds of waste from mines. This is possible due to the lack of regulation and urban planning by authorities. Irregularities exist in 85% of the city's neighborhoods but the neighborhoods of Lázaro Cárdenas, Minera, CNOP, Lomas de la Pimienta, Benito Juárez, González Ortega have the largest number of them. Many of these buildings have structural and infrastructure problems such as flooding during rains and the damage this creates.

== The city ==
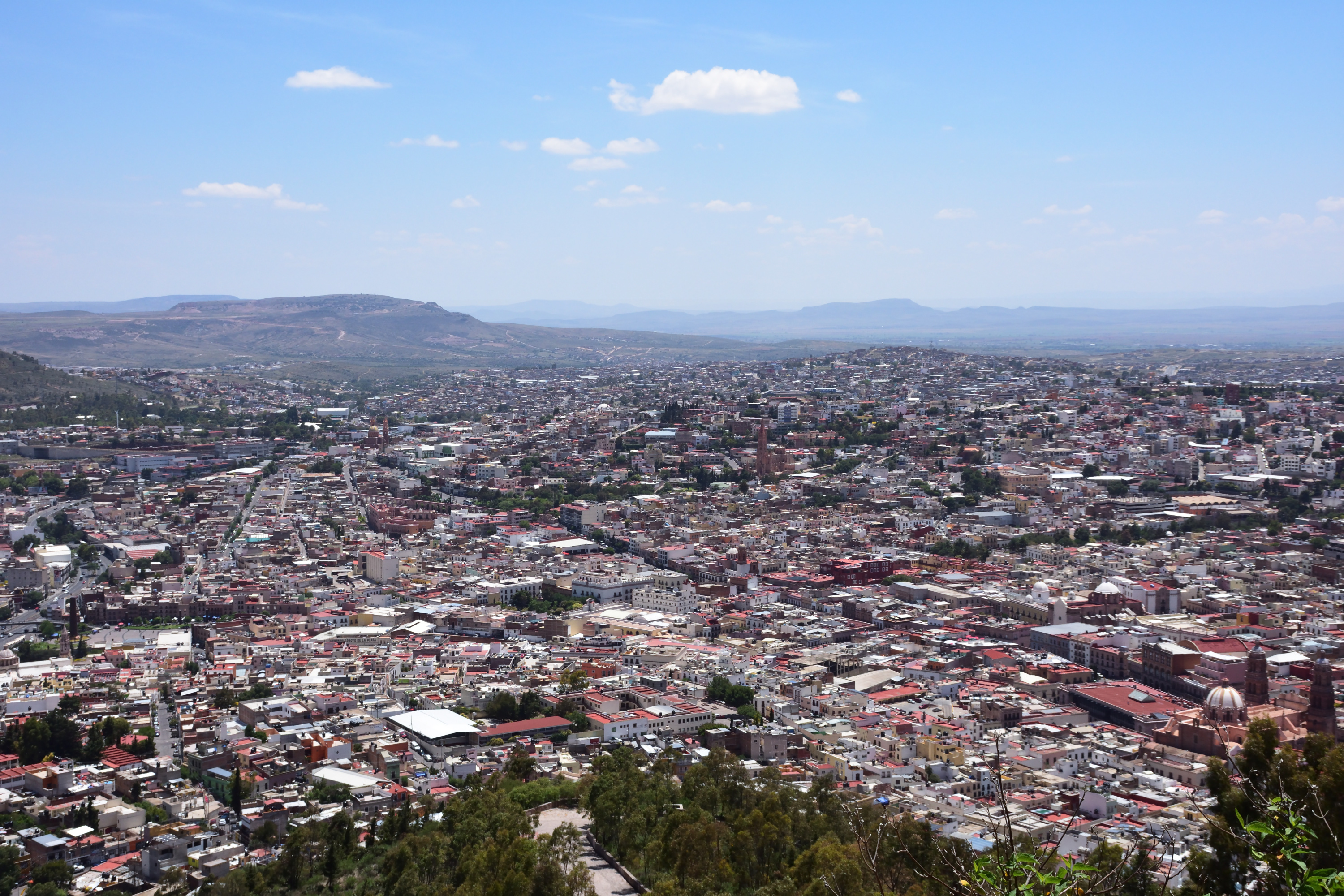
Zacatecas city as seen from Cerro de la Bufa.

The city is called "con rostro de cantera rosa y corazón de plata" (with a face of pink stone and a heart of silver) because of the pink stone that many of its iconic buildings are made of and the silver that has spurred its development and history. Like other mining cities in Mexico, such as Guanajuato and Taxco, the city was built near the mines on very rough terrain. It is at the foot of the Cerro de la Bufa, in which was one of the greatest silver mines in the world. Instead of having an orderly plan of streets, the Spanish settlement followed the old Indian neighborhoods with narrow streets and alleys squeezed into a large ravine or "cañada". Without attempting to modify the rough terrain, development also ran up the hills. The main road through town aligns north–south along the Arroyo de la Plata, with the rest of the city filled with small winding alleys and streets and tiny plazas. Many of the alleys have names that refer to local legends, such as the "Callejón del Indio Triste" (Alley of the Sad Indian) and "Callejón del Mono Prieto" (Alley of the Dark Monkey). The only really open space is the main plaza. Even here, it is not possible to stand back far enough to see the whole Baroque façade of the main cathedral.

Around the city are the Brittany hills or small mountains that contain silver and other minerals such as the Cerro de la Virgen, Cerro de Clérigos, Cerro del Grillo, Cerro del Padre and Cerro de la Bufa. These hills are starkly barren of vegetation, due to the semi-desert climate. The city is known for its clear air and clean streets, with garbage cans placed every ten meters in the city center.

This city, along with Guanajuato and Taxco are along a route called the "Ruta de la Plata" or Silver Route. These cities are distinguished not only for silver but for the conservation of their colonial façades and narrow streets. Zacatecas conserves many of its original structures from the colonial period such as churches, colonial government buildings and monasteries and mansions built by rich miners in pink stone. Most of these buildings were constructed in the 18th century, when the silver flowing out of the mines was at its highest. These buildings have made the historic center of the city a World Heritage Site.

=== Historic sites and attractions ===
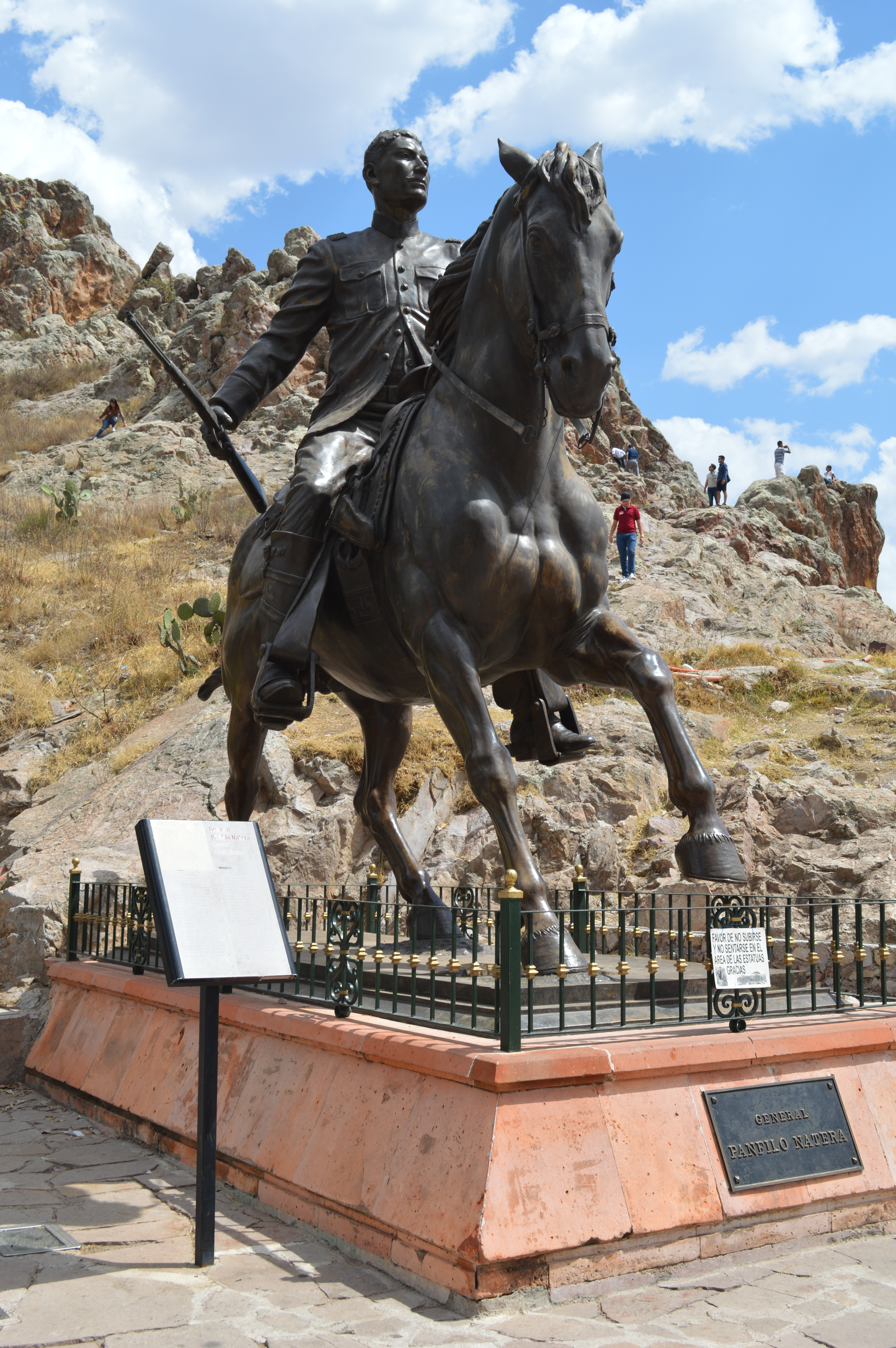
Equestrian statue of Pánfilo Natera at Cerro de la Bufa.

The Cerro de la Bufa, with its El Edén mine, is one of the most important symbols of the city and was the scene of the Battle of Zacatecas (called the Toma de Zacatecas in Spanish) in which Francisco Villa emerged victorious in 1914. At the top of this mountain is a museum and statues honoring Pánfilo Natera, Francisco Villa and Felipe Ángeles, which are related to this event. The site also contains an observatory, the Mausoleo de los Hombres Ilustres and the Chapel of Virgen del Patrocinio.

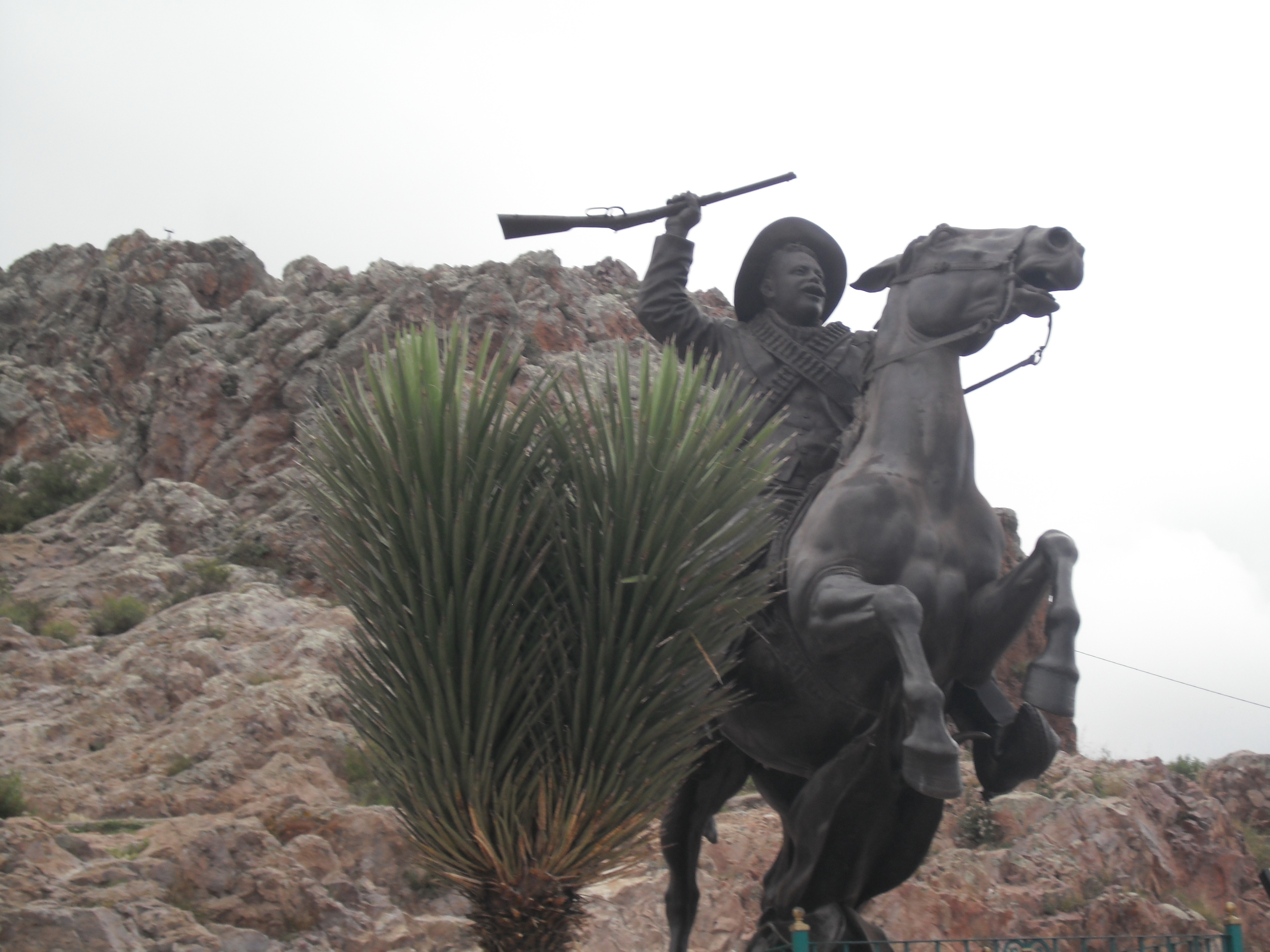
Equestrian statue of Pancho Villa, atop Cerro de la Bufa, site of his greatest victory.

The El Edén mine began operations in 1586 and principally produced gold and silver. According to legend the devil is supposed to be found in these parts due to the sound made when the wind whistles around the rocks. While mining operations began in the 16th century, their peak was reached in the 17th and 18th centuries. Despite the fact that there is still a significant amount of minerals left to extract, mining operations ceased in 1960, because the entrance is located in the middle of the city making this too hazardous. In 1975, the mine was converted into a tourist attraction. Today, visitors can take a small train which leads into the mountain for about a half a kilometer, then walk with a guide along some of the narrow passages. One of the things to see is an altar to the Santo Niño de Atocha. At night, the former rock crushing room of the mine has been converted into a nightclub.

The Toma de Zacatecas Museum is located on Cerro de la Bufa, which played at part in the Battle of Zacatecas during the Mexican Revolution. The museum was opened in 1984 and contains many articles from this battle as well as some from the Cristero War. Inside are clothing and uniforms, arms such as shotguns, Mausers and cannons, historic maps of Zacatecas and newspaper and photographs from the era. Photographs include those of Juana Gallo, who was a heroine of the Cristero War. Some battles from this conflict also took place on Cerro de la Bufa. The museum is fronted by the Plaza de la Revolución, which contains statues of Francisco Villa and two other generals who successfully led the attack on the city. The building housing the museum was originally the Casa de la Caridad y Hospital de Pobres. Next to the museum is the Chapel of Nuestra Señora del Patrocinio, an old hermitage from the 16th century. Its façade is Baroque with two levels. The Observatorio Meteorológico is mostly used to observe weather phenomenon.

Between Cerro de la Bufa and Cerro del Grillo is an aerial tramway or cable car that provides panoramic views of the city below. This cable car extends for about 650 meters, is called "El Teleférico" and was constructed in 1979 by the Swiss. The ride lasts about eight minutes, but does not operate when there are high winds.

=== Cathedral ===
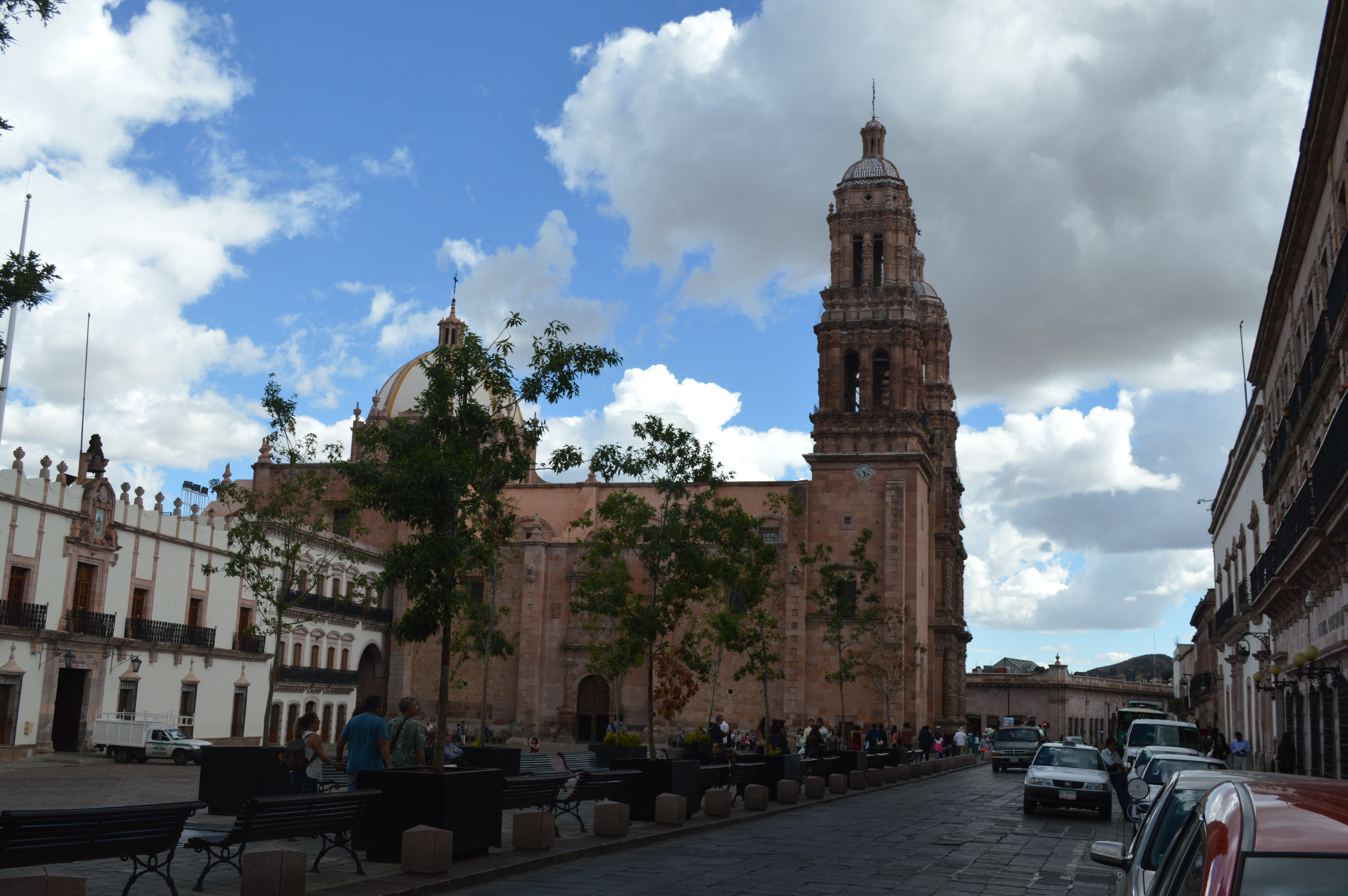
The cathedral was built between 1729 and 1753, regarded by many as the last, and greatest, expression of the churrigueresque style.

In the city proper just south of the main plaza, is the cathedral, which is located over the ruins of pre-Hispanic temples. The current structure dates from 1752 and has a façade of sculpted pink stone. The best time to appreciate the façade is in the late afternoon when the sun shines directly on it. This church is considered to be one of the best examples of Mexican Churrigueresque architecture. The first parish church was built on this site between 1567 and 1585, but it was in ruins by the beginning of the 17th century. A second church was built between 1612 and 1625 and was called the Chapel of Santo Cristo. The remains of this construction can be seen in the first level of the south tower and the main façade. The current cathedral was begun in 1729 with main façade finished in 1745 but not opened to worship until 1752.

The cathedral is attributed to Domingo Ximénez Hernández and is a testament to the wealth that the city had in the 18th century. Later on, additions were made. The dome was rebuilt in 1848 and the south tower was completed in 1904, by Dámaso Muñetón. The 19th-century dome is an imitation of the dome of the Church of Loreto in Mexico City. The church achieved cathedral status in 1862, and was declared a national monument in 1935. In 1965, the building was robbed of many of its precious metal items, which were never recovered.

The cathedral is eighty-five meters high and entirely constructed of pink sandstone. It has three naves with three main portals. The main façade has three levels supported by three Solomonic columns with flank niches. At the crest is a cross. The first level has three columns decorated with vines and angels. In its niches are statues of the Four Evangelists. The second level has columns formed by shells, acanthus and vines. The choir window is found here framed by stonework. The third level has an image of Christ with two of the Apostles flanked by solomonic columns decorated with leaves, caryatids and cherubs. The plaza side portal has two levels with stone columns and a sculpted scene of the crucified Christ with the Virgin Mary and John the Evangelist. The market side portal is Baroque and is dedicated to the Virgen del Patrocinio, patron of the city. The interior has a Latin cross layout with two naves and with the roof supported by Doric order columns. The altarpieces are made of stone in Neoclassical style. The main altar is dedicated to the Eucharist with side altars dedicated to the Holy Christ and the Virgin of Zacatecas. The American author Mrs. John Wesley Butler, in her book "Historic Churches in Mexico" tells us that the artist who designed the façade was French. This individual, condemned to death for some grave problem was able to get the execution postponed until he finished his work on the cathedral. He was able to continue the work for twenty-one years, being watched constantly by custodians and sentries while he worked. Finally bored with such a life, he declared one day that he was ready to be executed. But because of his work on the Cathedral façade he was not executed but received a pardon. The neighborhood showered him with gifts and banquets in his honor. Yet he was not content and desired to return to France. Unfortunately when all was ready for his departure he suddenly died. Where Mrs. Butler got this story is not known, since longtime residents of Zacatecas disclaim all knowledge of it.

=== Buildings and Plaza de Armas ===
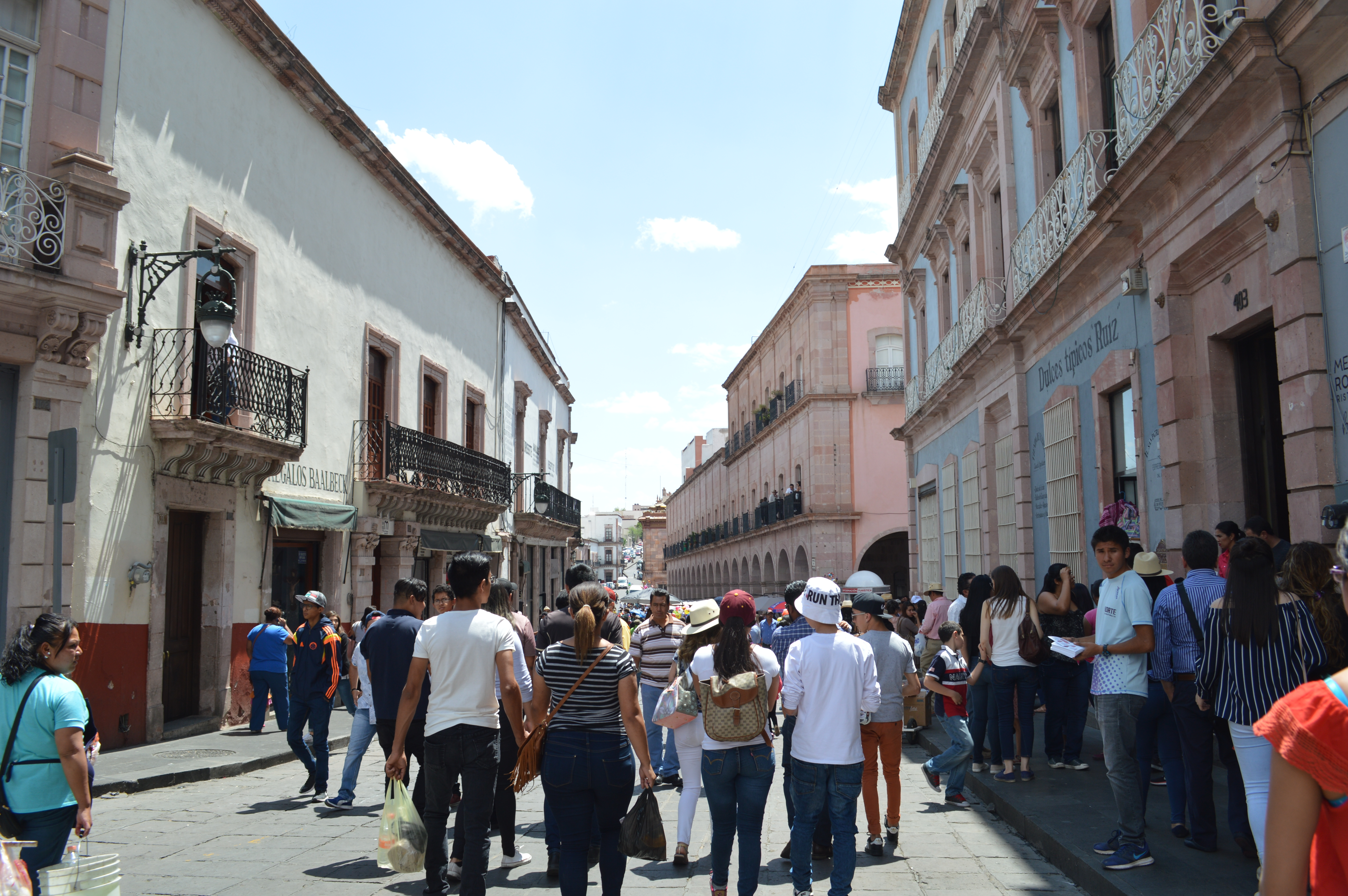
Hidalgo Avenue and Rosales Arcade in the bottom

The main square is called the Plaza de Armas, with the most important buildings such as the State Government Palace, the State Congress, the cathedral and others surrounding it. What is now the State Government Palace was constructed at the beginning of the 18th century as the residence of the Count de la Laguna. The exterior is marked by its red roof, and the interior has a courtyard surrounded by arches and a stairwell with a mural depicting the history of the state. This mural was painted in 1970 by Antonio Pintor Rodríguez.

One of the mansions that line the main plaza is called the "Palacio de la Mala Noche", which belonged to a miner named José Manuel de Rétegui in the 18th century. The name comes from a legend that states that the owner fell into poverty and one night decided to commit suicide. When he was at the point to doing so, he was informed that a rich vein had been found in one of his mines. Its façade has balconies and windows elaborated in sandstone. The main balcony is a half octagon. Today it houses the state supreme court. Another prominent mansion is the old house of González Ortega, which stands next to the cathedral and today is part of the governor's mansion.

==== Market ====
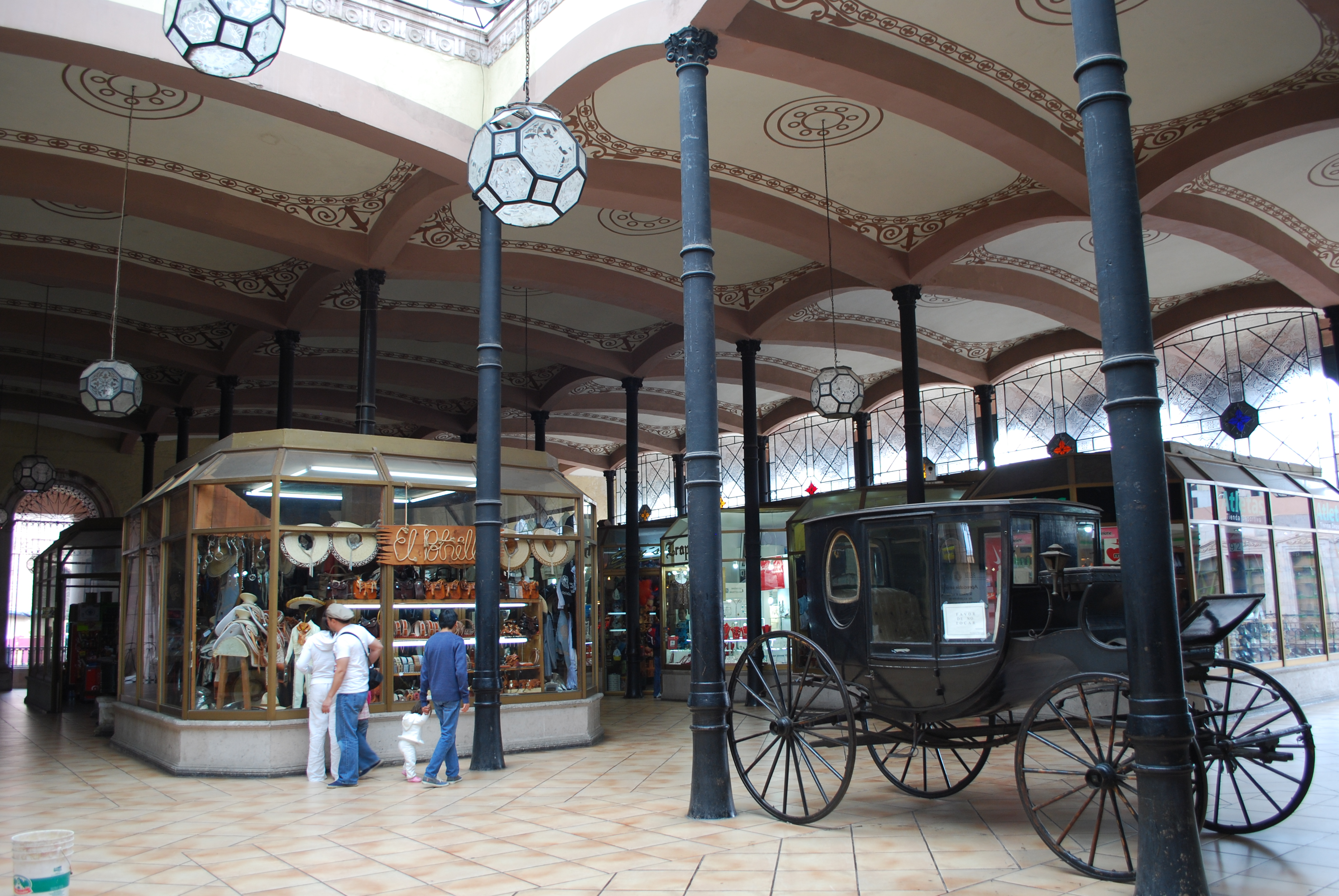
Market "Jesús González Ortega". The public market was constructed during the Porfiriato.

On the other side of the cathedral is the González Ortega Market, which was constructed in 1889 and still conserves its original façade. Originally, it was a traditional Mexican style market but has since been modernized into a mall with stores selling crafts, silver, leather, Zacatecas wine, antiques, charreada gear, Huichol needlework and regional sweets. There are also restaurants which offer regional dishes such as gorditas, asado de boda, pozole verde, pacholes, gorditas rellenas and enchiladas zacatecanas, filled with pork or cheese and covered in a sauce made with poblano, guajillo or ancho chili peppers. The interior of the building has two floors with wrought iron columns and the façade is French style fronted by the Plazoleta Goitia. Another market for crafts is the Casa de Artesanias in front of the Temple of San Agustín, which sells wool serapes, masks, Huichol figures, wood boxes, ceramics and more.

==== Churches ====
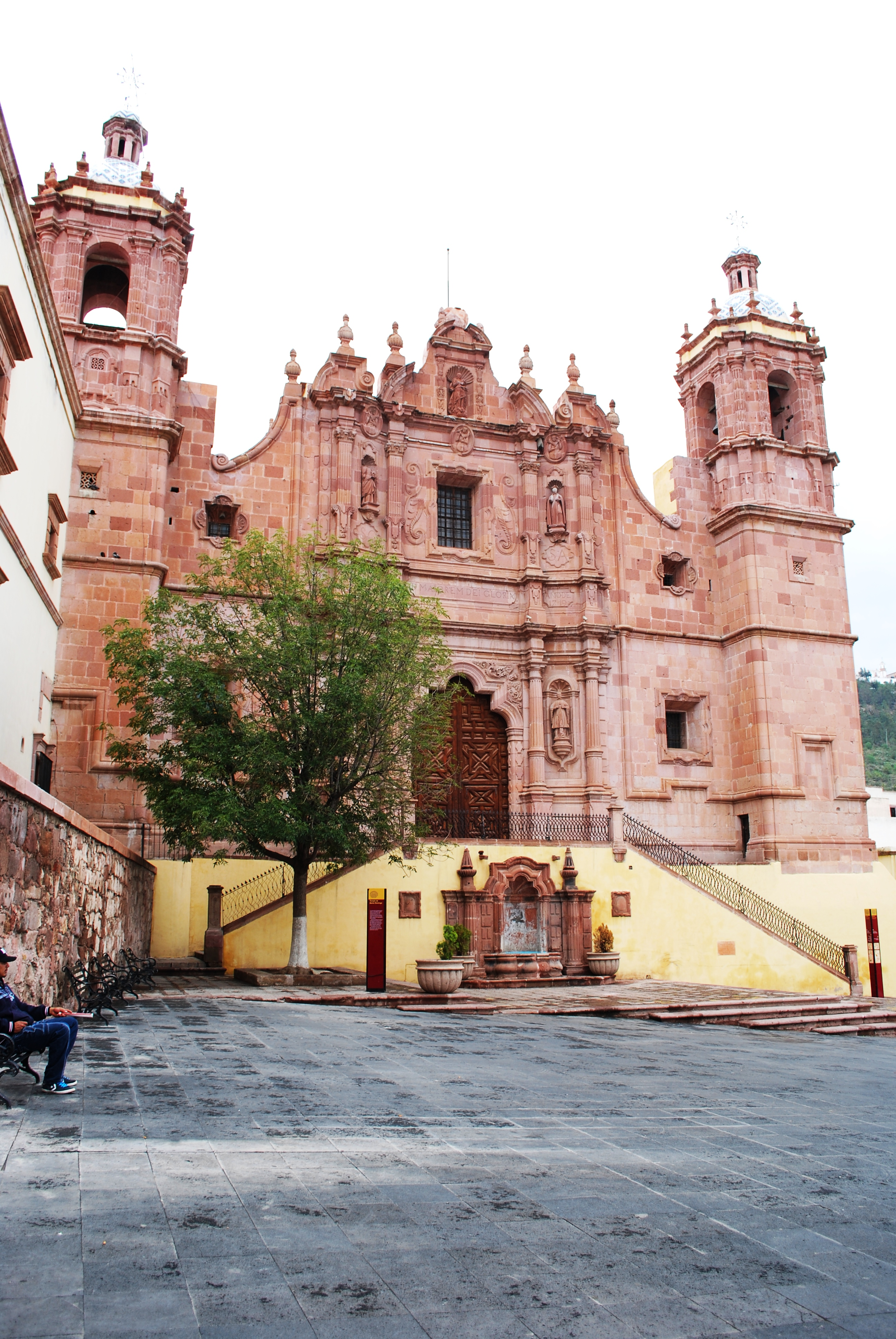
Church of Santo Domingo.

The former Temple of San Francisco was founded in 1568 as first monastery in Zacatecas, the monastery of Our Lady of Guadalupe, with the primary function of evangelization. It was inaugurated on January 12, 1707, but some parts of the buildings (such as the south tower) were not really completed until the 19th century. Today the monastery complex houses a museum but the church is in ruins. The vault of the central nave has fallen and many of its rooms and corridors are in ruins.

The church of St. Agustine (ex-templo de San Agustín) was built by the religious order of San Agustín which arrived in the City of Zacatecas in 1575; was consecrated in 1617 and was refurbished and re-consecrated in 1782. The building has been attributed to Andres Manuel de la Riva, who built La Valenciana Church and monastery in Guanajuato. After the Reform Laws, the complex was sold to private buyers who turned it into a pool hall and hotel or apartments. In 1882, it was sold again, this time to the American Presbyterian Society, which demolished the main façade because it did not represent the concepts of that society. The Catholic Church regained possession in 1942 and it is now the Bishop's palace. Reconstruction efforts began in 1948 and continued sporadically until 1969. Only part of the monastery complex survives and is home to the Rafael Coronel Museum. The right side façade of the church remains, worked in sculpted stone, with the scene of St. Agustine being converted to Christianity. Inside, the church has distinctive arches as well as a cupola and side portal. The sacristy contains some of the sculptures from the original main façade. It also contains a collection of colonial artwork and hosts exhibitions.

The Temple of Santo Domingo Jesuit church of Santo Domingo, built between 1746 and 1749 by Cayetano de Sigüenza. It is known locally as the Parish of the Inmaculada Concepción. The Church of Santo Domingo is built over a solid platform, which makes it look more monumental. It was taken over by the Dominicans when the Jesuits were expelled from Mexico in the 18th century. It would substitute for the cathedral when it was in construction. It has a sober Baroque portal, with altarpieces and paintings in its interior. Attached to this church is the monastery building of the Company of Jesus, which contains the current Pedro Coronel Museum. Inside the church are eight Churrigueresque altars, which are carved of wood and gilded with gold mined from the Cerro del Grillo. However, the main altar is Neoclassical. The Churringueresque altars are attributed to Felipe de Ureña and his son-in-law, Juan García de Castañeda.

==== Theater ====
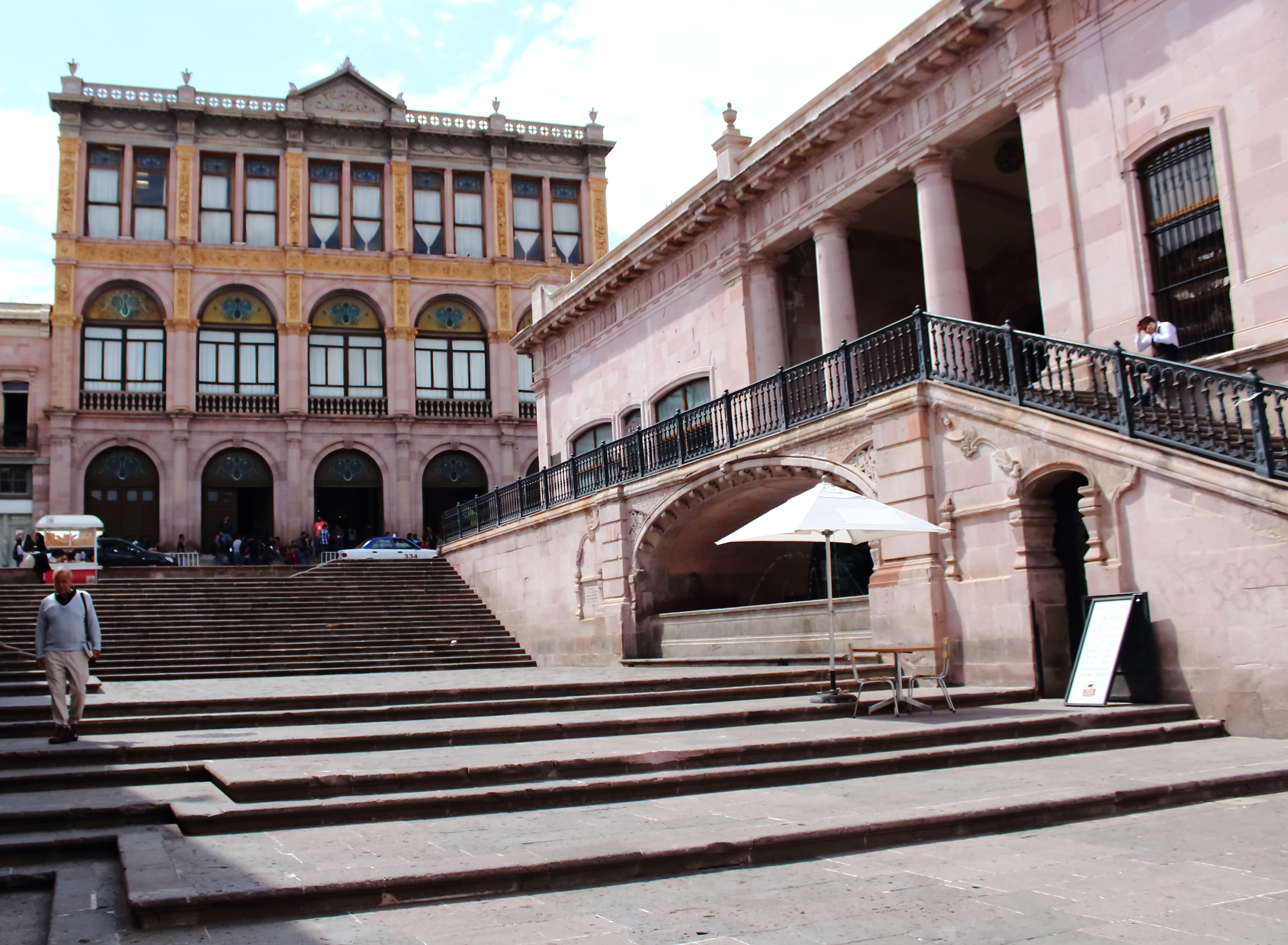
Calderón Theatre (background) and González Ortega market (right).

The Calderón Theater was built to replace a theater which had burned in the late 1880s (where the González Ortega Market is now). The theater has been in operation since then, having hosted famous performers such as Ángela Peralta. The building is built in a Renaissance revival style and has a hall with large mirrors made in Venice.

=== Other attractions ===
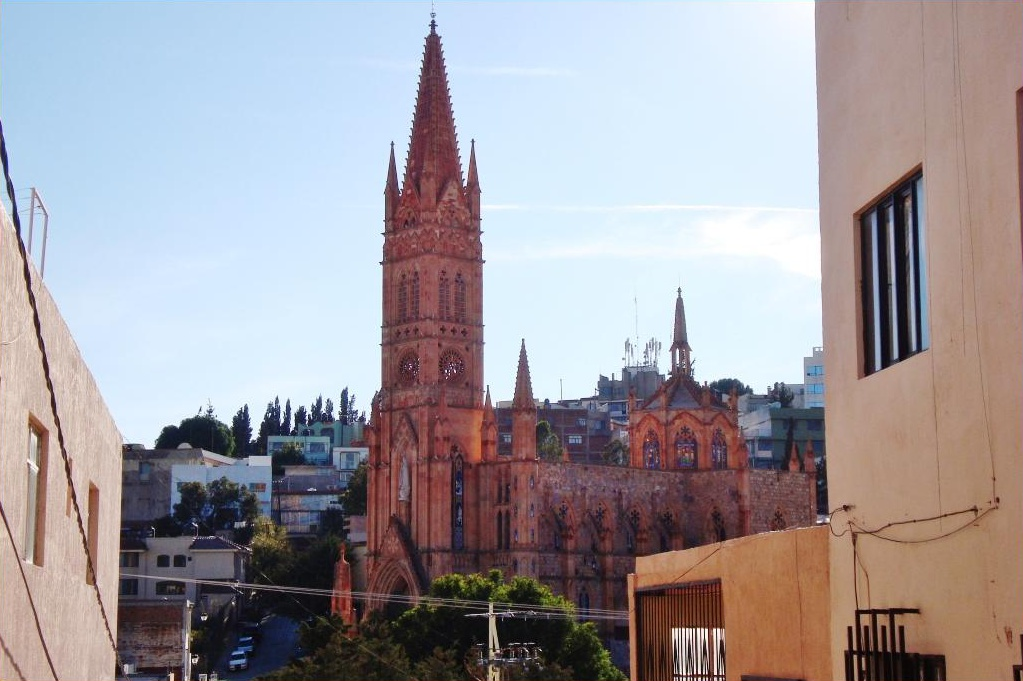
Church of Our Lady of Fátima.

There are also a number of lesser known landmarks in the city. The first city park is the Alameda Trinidad García de la Cadena, which was built in the early 19th century. The Enrique Estrada General Park contains an enormous kiosk. The Meson de Jobito is a 19th-century building which is part of the garden dedicated to Benito Juárez. The former Bernárdez Hacienda now contains an artisans’ school which specializes in the making of silver items. Other mines that can be visited include La Esperanza, which extends 520 meters inside Cerro del Grillo. The Church of Nuestra Señora de Fátima is an example of the relatively rare Gothic architecture in Mexico. The Mauricio Magdaleno Public Library is in a 19th-century building which served as the granary. The façade contains an image of a winged Victory.

The former Plaza de Toros and El Cubo aqueduct are located on one side of the Cerro de la Bufa. The Plaza de Toros bullring was inaugurated in 1866 and conserves much of its original architecture. Events featuring bullfighters such as Lino Zamora, Epifanio del Rio, Eloy Cavazos, Manolo Martínez and Curro Rivera were held here. However, the plaza was eventually closed in 1975, and abandoned. After eleven years, it was almost demolished but it was instead rehabilitated and converted into a hotel and place to hold events. The Hotel Quinta Real was built by Mexicans Ricardo and Roberto Elías Pessah and contains 49 suites. The corridors maintain the bullring atmosphere as do the stores, restaurant and event halls. The El Cubo aqueduct was built at the end of the 18th century to carry water from the El Cubo mine area, which gave the structure its name. Only a few arches of it remain.

== Museums ==
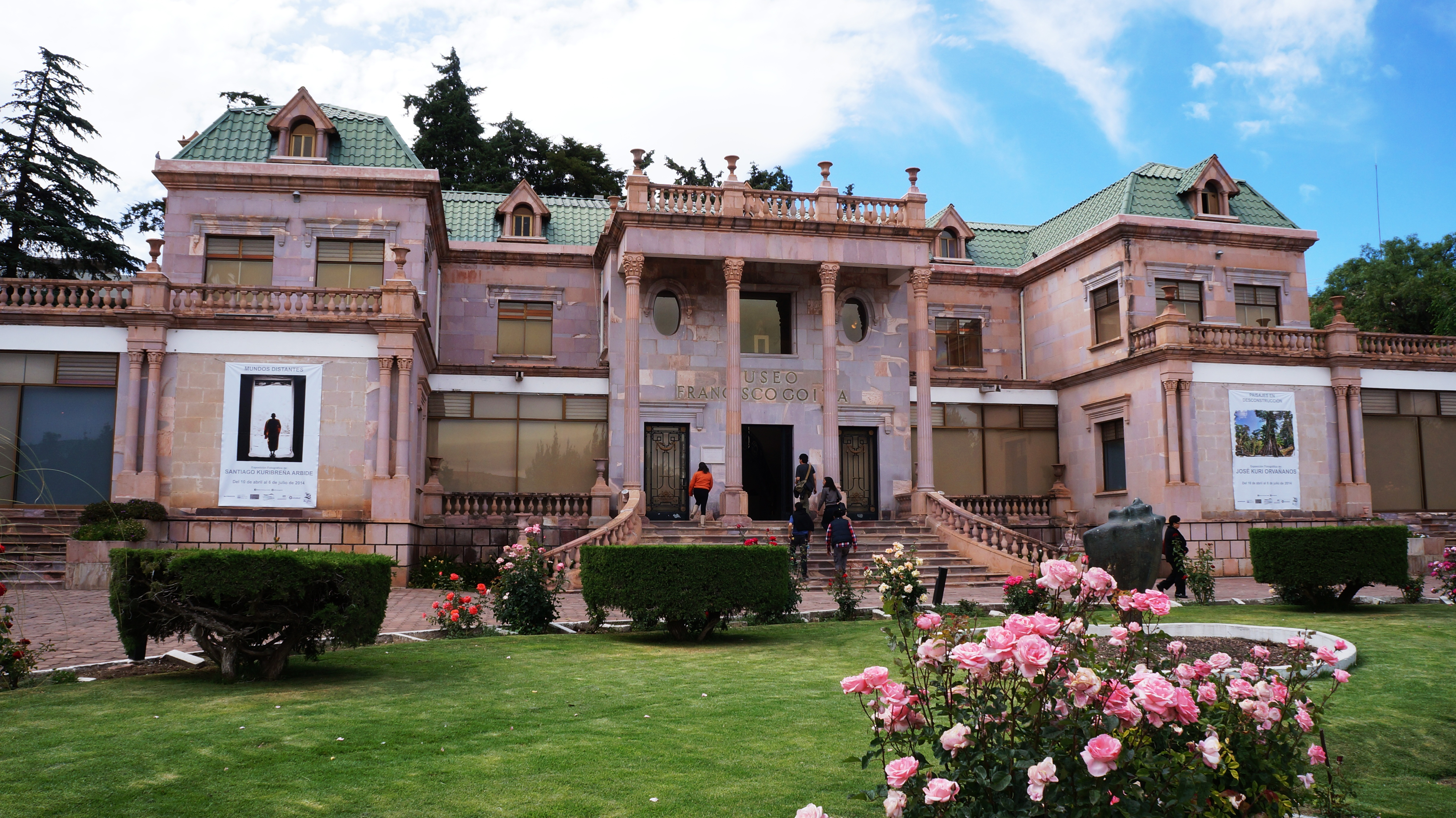
The Francisco Goitia Museum is housed in the former residence of the Governor of the State of Zacatecas

In relation to its population, Zacatecas is one of the cities with the most museums in the nation. The Pedro Coronel Museum is located in the old monastery of the Santo Domingo church, which also housed the former Jesuit college of San Luis Gonzaga. San Luis was famous throughout Latin America for the quality of his teaching (one pupil of this college was Father Antonio Núñez de Miranda, the spiritual father of Juana Inés de la Cruz, the Mexican poet). Following the expulsion of the Jesuits and a brief interlude in the hands of the Dominicans, the college was converted successively into a barracks, a prison and a warehouse before being restored in 1981. The museum is mostly dedicated to the works of Zacatecas painter Pedro Coronel as well as works by others that he collected. The archive includes works by Pablo Picasso, Dalí, Miró, Braque, Chagall, Basarelli, Eduardo Degas and Hogart. There are also halls dedicated to works from Africa, India, Egypt, China and Greece. The museum also contains an important collection of medals and 25,000 volumes which made up the libraries of the old convents (including 15,000 from Our Lady of Guadalupe alone). Most of these are in the Elías Armador Historical Library, which contains over 20,000 volumes.

The Rafael Coronel Museum, named after the brother of Pedro Coronel, is housed in eight halls of the monastery complex which was part of the Church of San Francisco. This museum is dedicated to historic relics with the main collection being 5,000 masks made of wood. leather and clay coming from many of Mexico's regional cultures, past and present. Many represent historic and supernatural figures. It also contains drawings and sketches by Diego Rivera. In the halls dedicated to the colonial period, there is a set of terracotta figures from the 17th and 18th centuries and in the Rosete Aranda Hall there is a collection of puppets from Burma, Indonesia and China. There is also a collection of masks and puppets which belonged to one of the most important theatrical companies in 20th-century Mexico. This museum was begun when Rafael donated 10,764 pieces from his own collection to the city of Zacatecas.

The Manuel Felguérez Museum contains a large collection of abstract art by the namesake and other artists covering three generations. One exhibition is the "Murals of Osaka" created in 1969 when Fernando Gamboa was commissioned to archive Mexico's pavilion at the World's Fair in Osaka in 1970. Since the event, the murals remained stored for decades until this permanent exhibition was installed. Artists represented include Lilia Carrillo, Francisco Corzas, Roger Van Gunten and Francisco Icasa. It includes permanent workshop space for etching, an auditorium and exhibition halls. Its building dates from the 18th century, which was the site of the Seminario Conciliar, and later a barracks and penitentiary. The current museum was inaugurated in 1998.

The Zacatecano Museum is on Doctor Hierro Street and houses a collection of Huichol art, folk retablos (ex-votos) (folk paintings giving thanks for a miracle) and wrought ironwork. This building used to be the Casa de Moneda (coin mint) between 1802 and 1905. Other museums include Museo de Pintura Colonial and Casa Museo Ramón López Velarde. Still other museums include the Episcopal Gallery, the Museo de la Ciencia and the Francisco Goitia Museum. The Episcopal Gallery is located to the side of the cathedral and contains religious art from the 19th and 20th centuries. It contains religious paraphernalia, paintings and sculptures related to Catholic Church history including a multilingual Bible from 1772. The Museo de la Ciencia (Science Museum) is located in the old central building of the Universidad Autónoma de Zacatecas and contains collections documenting the advances of physics, mathematics and natural sciences. The Francisco Goitia Museum contains works by this Zacatecas artist as well as works by Julio Ruelas, Pedro and Rafael Coronel, Manuel Felguérez and Jose Kuri Brena.

== Education ==
=== Universities and technical education ===
The city contains a number of universities and institutions of higher education, including the state-sponsored Universidad Autónoma de Zacatecas

The Universidad Tecnológica del Estado de Zacatecas (UTEZ) is part of a technological university system across the Mexico. It was founded in 1998 by the state government of Zacatecas focusing on majors in technology and business.

Other technical schools are the Instituto Tecnológico de Zacatecas, the Instituto Politécnico de Zacatecas, and a campus of the ITESM college system.

== Festivals and celebrations ==
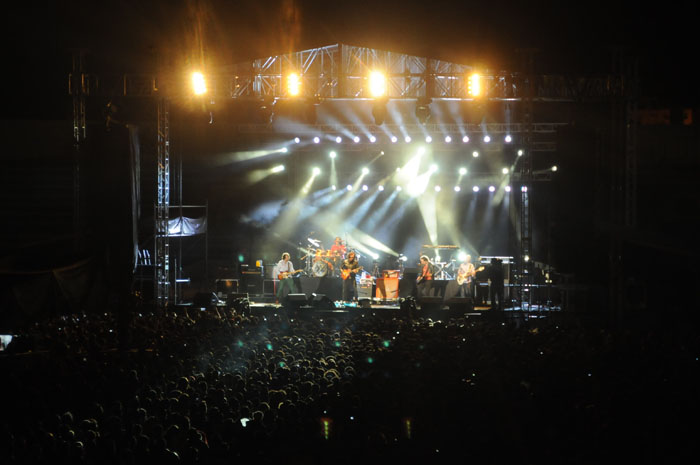
Caifanes at the Fair of Zacatecas, 2012.

The city hosts a number of religious and cultural festivals throughout the year. The Festival Cultural de Zacatecas is held each year in the city during Holy Week, which unites artists of different genres from classic to rock and offers visitors more than 130 attractions. Some of the artists have included La Barranca, Real de Catorce, blues singer Betsy Pecannins and singer Vicky Carr. There are also theatrical events and events for children. About 90% of the events are free. The event is organized by the state of Zacatecas with support from the Universidad Autónoma de Zacatecas, ISSSTE, IMSS, CONACULTA and other government agencies.

The Feria Nacional de Zacatecas is held during the month of September at the foot of the Cerro de la Bufa. It includes concerts, bullfighting, events at the Foro Infantil, crafts expositions as well as exhibitions of livestock, autos and culture. The annual event began in 1940 and received more than two million visitors each year since 2002. The main concert hall for the event has a capacity of 5,000 and has hosted names such as Vicente Fernández, Alejandra Guzmán, Rocío Dúrcal, Rio Roma, and Ha*Ash. It has exhibition and sales of crafts, livestock and food. Other events include charreadas and bullfighting. The evening has folkloric dance and fireworks.

The Festival Zacatecas del Folclor International takes place the first week of August.

Religious events include the feast of the Virgin of Zacatecas and the feast of the Virgin del Patrocinio. Activities associated with these events include parades with floats, musical concerts, bullfighting, processions and other religious events. The Virgin of Zacatecas is housed in a chapel built in 1728 and regularly receives visitors from the city and other areas. The Virgin of Patrocinio, whose day is September 14, celebrates one of the most celebrated images in the Zacatecas area. This event lasts for ten days with traditional dances, processions and more. This feast coincides with the Feria Nacional de Zacatecas and Mexico's Independence Day. On Good Friday, a large procession called the "Procession of Silence" is held.

The last three days of August are dedicated to an event called Morismas de Bracho. This event involves approximately 5,000 people in costume who commemorate the decapitation of John the Baptist and the struggle of Christians against the Moors, with the principal players representing Charlemagne, Mohamed and John the Baptist. The staging occurs at El Bracho Park, behind the Cerro de la Bufa and ends with the decapitation of Mohamed.

On June 23, the town commemorates the Battle of Zacatecas at the Cerro de la Bufa and the Plaza de Armas with cultural events and fireworks.

Needing no date or special reason for celebration are the "callejoneadas" or alleyway parties. These are considered to be a traditional form of nightlife in which one can dance, sing and drink mezcal or beer-based punch called "heribertas" for free. According to tradition, these parties were begun by a college student named Heriberto, whose last name has been lost. They are most commonly held at the end of the school year, but no reason is needed to hold one. Most callejoneadas form in front of the Palacio de Gobierno, where a "tambora" band or other type of band, a group of revelers and a donkey carrying jugs of "heribertas" gather. The donkey is often painted or otherwise decorated. The party then winds its way around the narrow streets and alleys of the city, with people drinking the heribertos from little jars called jarritos. Most of the revelers are students but all are welcome to join.

Zacatecas is the seat of a United Nations Educational, Scientific and Cultural Organization (UNESCO) Category II Regional Office, to promote training, research and conservation of artistic, historical, natural and archaeological heritage of Mexico, Central America and the Caribbean. It is the fourth such office to be established after those in China, Brazil and Bahrain. The office is in charge of fourteen percent of the World Heritage Sites in the world.

The city's chamber music festival has been held annually since 1993. It is organized by the Instituto Zacatecano de Cultura with support from the Escuela de Musica of the Universidad de Zacatecas as well as other local and national entities.

== Transportation ==
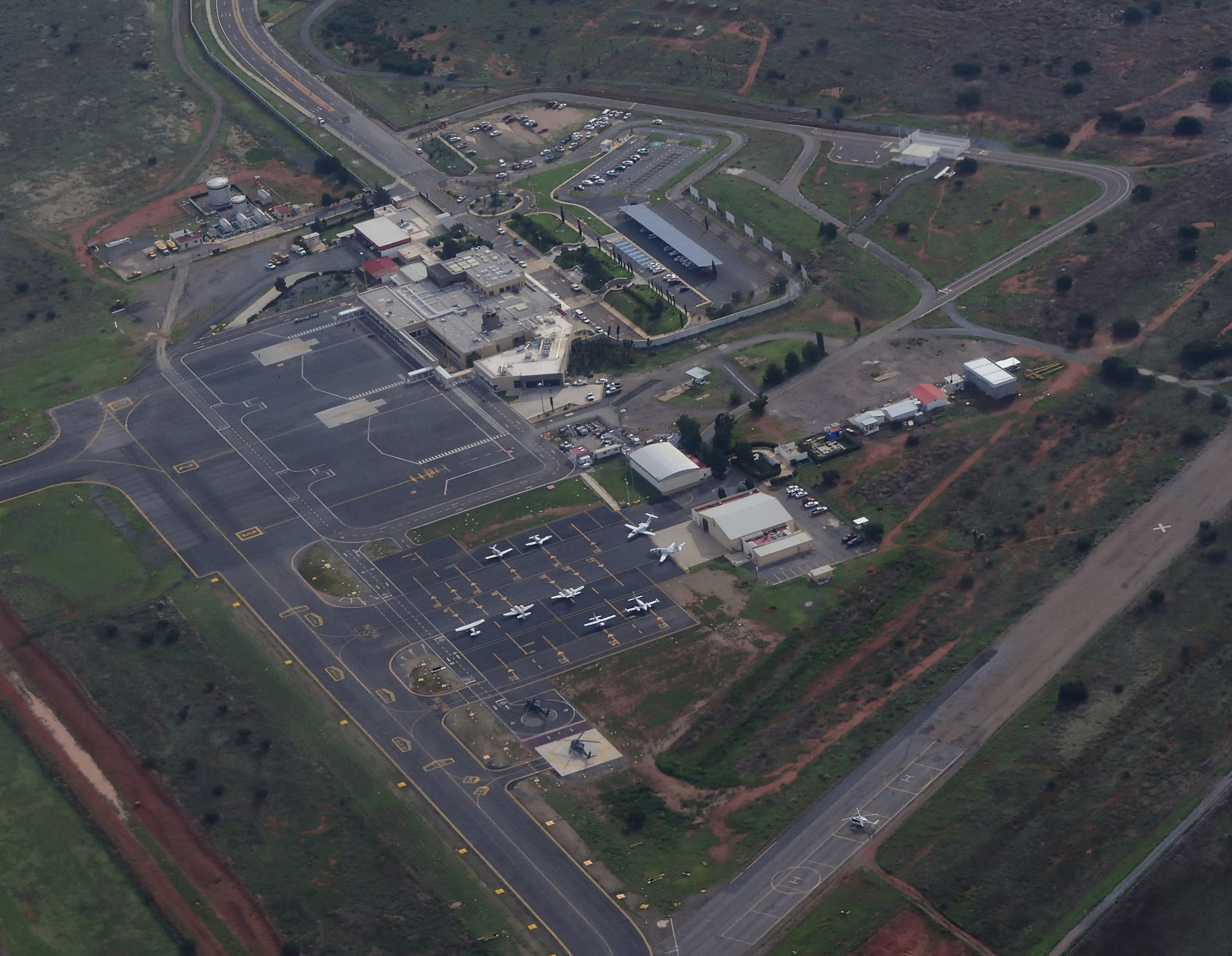
Zacatecas airport.

By highway, Zacatecas is connected to Aguascalientes via Fed 45, to San Luis Potosí via Fed 49, Fed 23 to Guadalajara and Torreón and Fed 54 to Guadalajara and Saltillo. There is a rail line called the "Ferrocarril Central" that still connects the city with other parts such as Ciudad Juárez and Mexico City. The city is served by the General Leobardo C. Ruiz International Airport, which connects the city with Tijuana, Morelia, Leon, and Mexico City. Intercity busses connect the city with other regional cities such as Fresnillo as well as national destinations such as Guadalajara, Ciudad Juárez and Mexico City. There is also transportation to locations such as Plateros, and the Sanctuary of the Niño de Atocha. There is also public transportation intra-city as well.

== The municipality ==
=== Geography ===
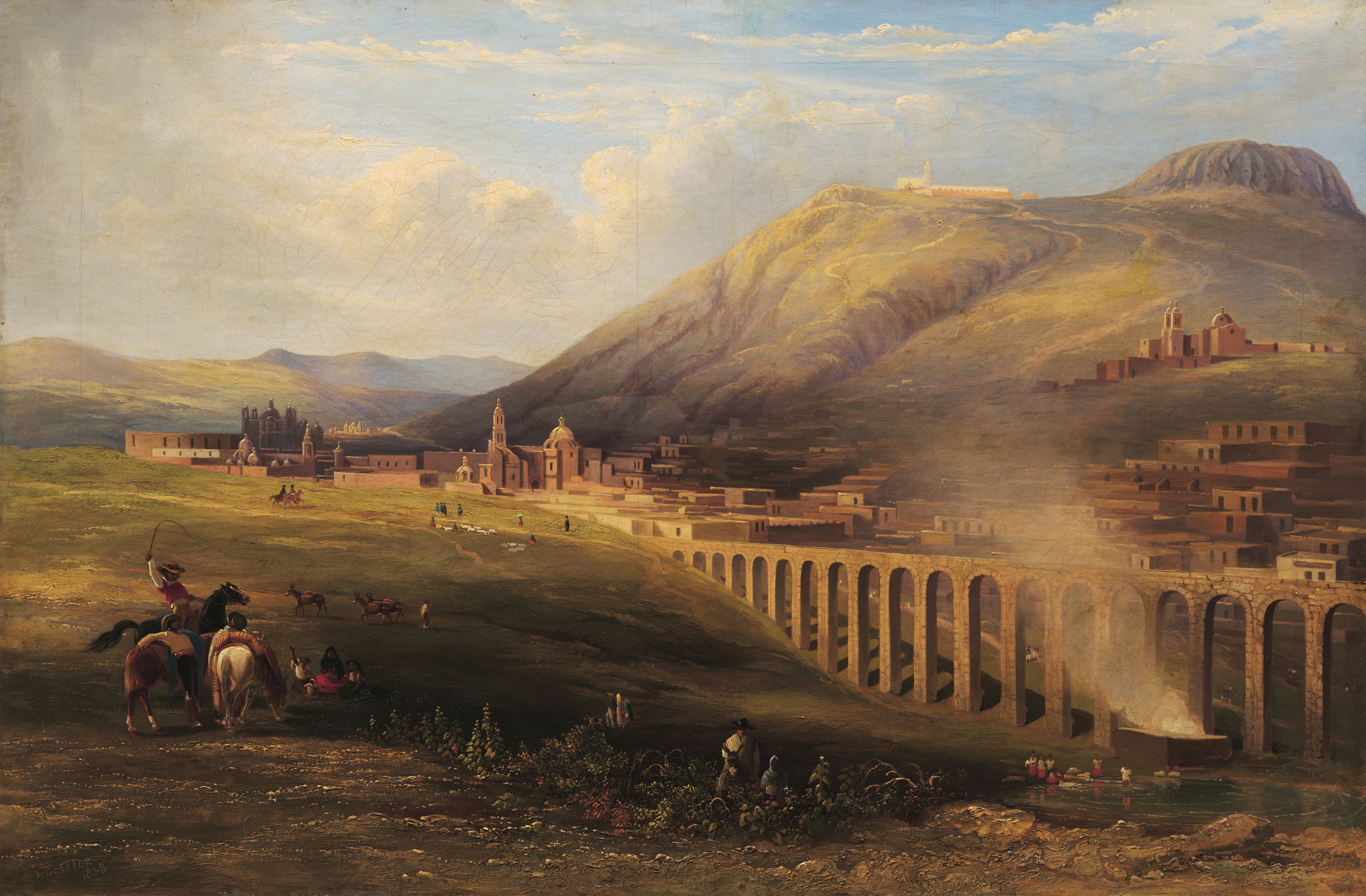
View of Zacatecas. 1838 - Daniel Thomas Egerton

As municipal seat, the city of Zacatecas is the governmental authority for 180 other named localities, which total an area of 444 km^{2} (171 sq mi). Ninety-three percent of the municipality's population of 132,035 lives in the city proper. There are no indigenous communities in the municipalities with almost all of the population being "mestizo" or mixed indigenous-European. Under 500 people speak an indigenous language such as Huichol and Zacateco but most of these are from other parts of Mexico and speak Spanish as well. The municipality borders the municipalities of Calera, Morelos, Vetagrande, Guadalupe, Genaro Codina and Jerez.

The municipality is wedged between the Sierra Madre Occidental and the subrange called Sierras y Valles Zacatecanos. The area is very rugged terrain filled with narrow valleys, ravines and mountains. The principal elevations include Cerro El Grillo at 2,690 m (8,830 ft), Cerro Los Alamitos at 2,680 m (8,790 ft), Cerro La Bufa at 2,650 m (8,690 ft), Cerro La Mesa at 2,590 m (8,500 ft), Mesas El Rincón Colorado at 2,540 m (8,330 ft), Cerro La Mesa at 2,440 m (8,010 ft) and Cerro Grande at 2,370 m (7,780 ft). The area is divided between the Lerma River and El Salado River basins, with a large number of small streams and arroyos crossing the territory.

=== Demographics ===
The 2020 INEGI census reported a population of 149,607 people in the municipality of Zacatecas, of whom 77,635 are female and 71,972 are male.

=== Climate ===
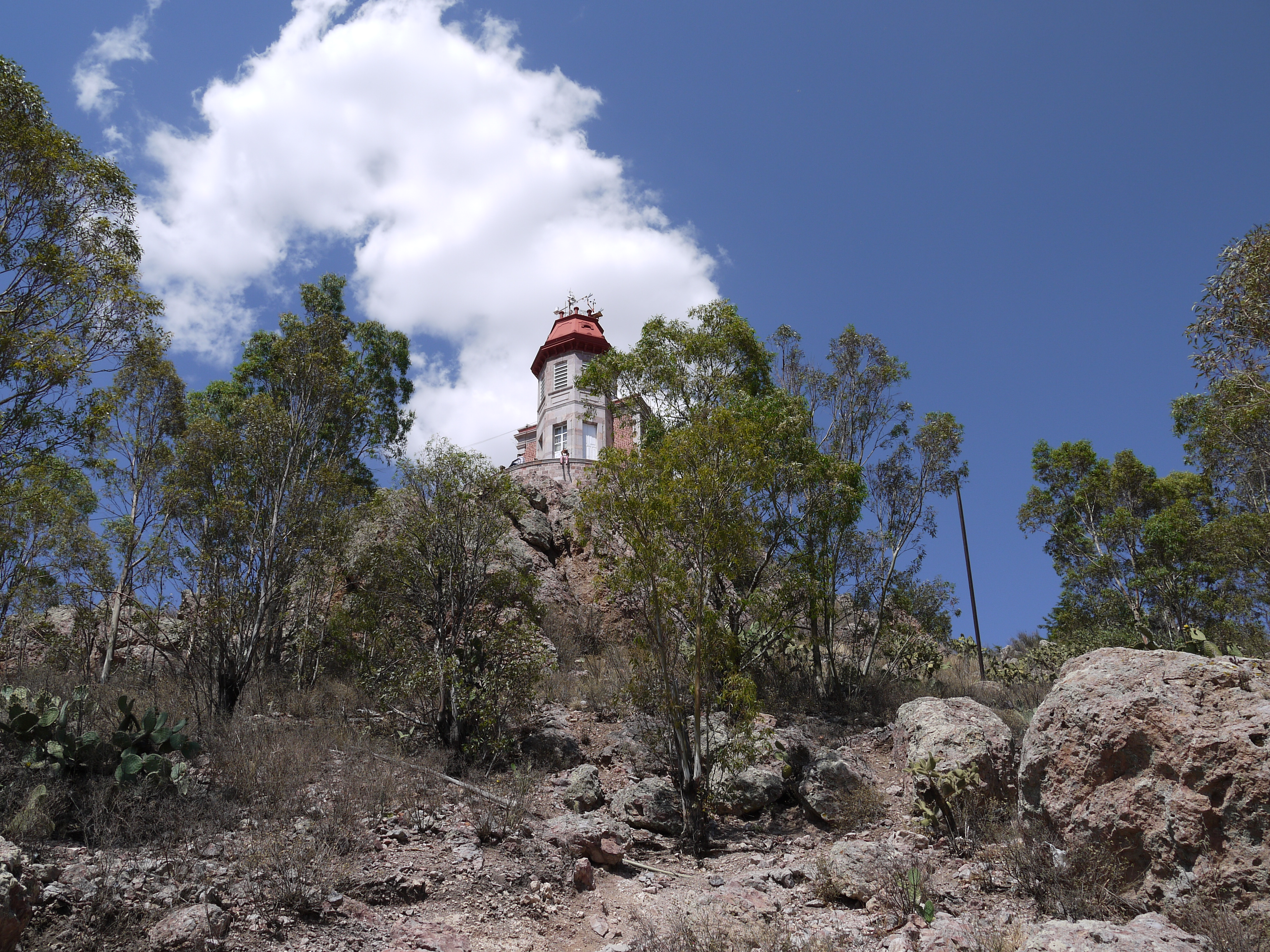
Zacatecas weather station atop Cerro de la Bufa

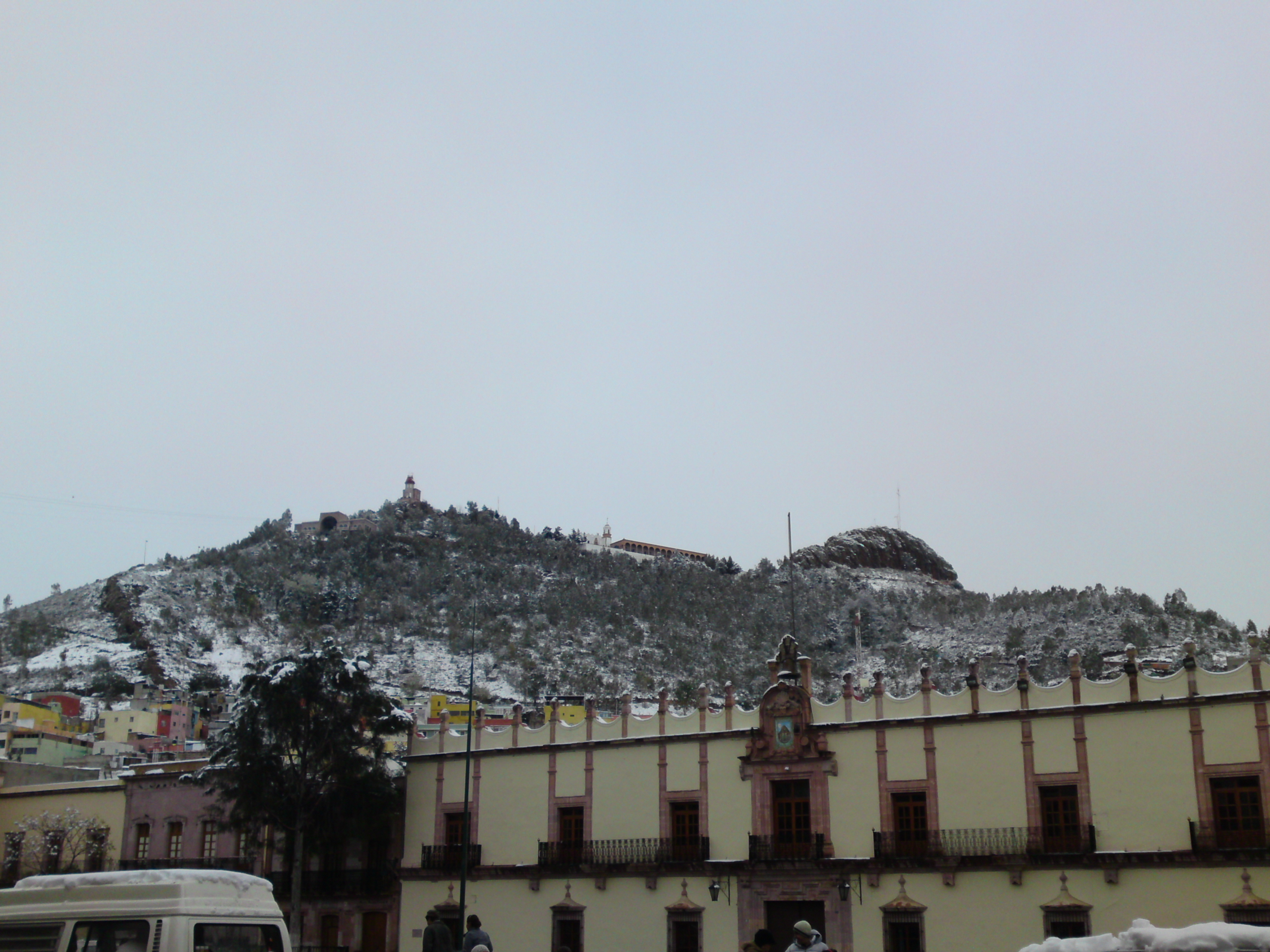
View of Zacatecas during a cold winter

Zacatecas City has a cold semi-arid climate (BSk, according to the Köppen climate classification), with an average annual temperature of 15.7 °C (60 °F). Freezing temperatures are not uncommon, especially in January and February. During the winter of 2017–2018, Zacatecas municipality reached temperatures that haven't been reached in several years as −12 °C with a wind chill of −16 °C, although the coldest temperature occurred in Fresnillo which its another city close to Zacatecas City, where the temperature dropped to −15 °C with a wind chill of −20 °C. Most rain falls between June and September, and there is a defined winter. Principal wild vegetation is that adapted to dry areas such as nopals, mesquite, maguey and grasses, with pines and live oaks in the higher elevations. Wildlife includes coyotes, grey foxes, bobcats, opossums, rabbits, raccoons, other small mammals as well as variety of small birds and reptiles.

Climate data for Zacatecas (Buenavista), elevation: 2352 m, 1991–2020 normals, extremes 1961–2018
Month	Jan	Feb	Mar	Apr	May	Jun	Jul	Aug	Sep	Oct	Nov	Dec	Year
Record high °C (°F)	28.0 (82.4)	29.0 (84.2)	30.5 (86.9)	34.0 (93.2)	36.0 (96.8)	36.0 (96.8)	31.0 (87.8)	29.9 (85.8)	30.5 (86.9)	30.0 (86.0)	29.0 (84.2)	28.0 (82.4)	36.0 (96.8)
Mean daily maximum °C (°F)	17.8 (64.0)	20.1 (68.2)	22.3 (72.1)	24.7 (76.5)	26.8 (80.2)	25.6 (78.1)	24.0 (75.2)	24.0 (75.2)	22.7 (72.9)	22.1 (71.8)	20.3 (68.5)	18.3 (64.9)	22.4 (72.3)
Daily mean °C (°F)	11.7 (53.1)	13.4 (56.1)	15.3 (59.5)	17.5 (63.5)	19.6 (67.3)	19.4 (66.9)	18.0 (64.4)	18.0 (64.4)	17.2 (63.0)	16.2 (61.2)	14.1 (57.4)	12.3 (54.1)	16.1 (61.0)
Mean daily minimum °C (°F)	5.6 (42.1)	6.8 (44.2)	8.2 (46.8)	10.3 (50.5)	12.5 (54.5)	13.1 (55.6)	12.0 (53.6)	12.1 (53.8)	11.6 (52.9)	10.3 (50.5)	7.8 (46.0)	6.3 (43.3)	9.7 (49.5)
Record low °C (°F)	−6.3 (20.7)	−3.5 (25.7)	−3.1 (26.4)	3.0 (37.4)	5.0 (41.0)	8.0 (46.4)	1.5 (34.7)	5.0 (41.0)	3.5 (38.3)	2.0 (35.6)	−3.5 (25.7)	−11.0 (12.2)	−11.0 (12.2)
Average precipitation mm (inches)	18.5 (0.73)	13.2 (0.52)	9.5 (0.37)	7.9 (0.31)	19.8 (0.78)	87.5 (3.44)	106.3 (4.19)	95.8 (3.77)	96.1 (3.78)	34.3 (1.35)	15.1 (0.59)	13.6 (0.54)	517.6 (20.38)
Average precipitation days (≥ 0.1 mm)	2.3	1.3	1.1	1.1	3.4	9.0	10.6	9.2	9.1	4.9	1.8	2.2	56.0
Average snowy days	0.33	0	0.03	0	0	0	0	0	0	0	0.46	0.11	0.93
Source 1: Servicio Meteorologico Nacional
Source 2: Colegio de Postgraduados (snow)

Climate data for Zacatecas (La Bufa), elevation: 2576 m (1991–2020 normals, extremes 1951–2018)
Month	Jan	Feb	Mar	Apr	May	Jun	Jul	Aug	Sep	Oct	Nov	Dec	Year
Record high °C (°F)	29.0 (84.2)	28.6 (83.5)	29.8 (85.6)	35.0 (95.0)	34.8 (94.6)	32.0 (89.6)	31.0 (87.8)	30.5 (86.9)	29.4 (84.9)	25.5 (77.9)	27.9 (82.2)	21.8 (71.2)	35.0 (95.0)
Mean daily maximum °C (°F)	15.2 (59.4)	17.2 (63.0)	18.8 (65.8)	21.5 (70.7)	23.3 (73.9)	22.0 (71.6)	20.5 (68.9)	20.3 (68.5)	19.0 (66.2)	18.7 (65.7)	17.3 (63.1)	15.6 (60.1)	19.1 (66.4)
Daily mean °C (°F)	10.3 (50.5)	11.9 (53.4)	13.7 (56.7)	15.9 (60.6)	17.9 (64.2)	17.0 (62.6)	15.5 (59.9)	15.3 (59.5)	14.5 (58.1)	14.1 (57.4)	12.3 (54.1)	11.0 (51.8)	14.1 (57.4)
Mean daily minimum °C (°F)	6.3 (43.3)	7.5 (45.5)	8.9 (48.0)	11.0 (51.8)	12.7 (54.9)	12.4 (54.3)	11.4 (52.5)	11.5 (52.7)	11.3 (52.3)	10.6 (51.1)	8.6 (47.5)	7.4 (45.3)	10.0 (50.0)
Record low °C (°F)	−14.0 (6.8)	−9.2 (15.4)	−4.2 (24.4)	−1.6 (29.1)	1.0 (33.8)	1.4 (34.5)	1.3 (34.3)	1.0 (33.8)	0.0 (32.0)	1.0 (33.8)	−5.1 (22.8)	−12.2 (10.0)	−14.0 (6.8)
Average precipitation mm (inches)	12.1 (0.48)	9.0 (0.35)	4.0 (0.16)	3.5 (0.14)	12.0 (0.47)	61.3 (2.41)	94.0 (3.70)	73.7 (2.90)	73.7 (2.90)	23.3 (0.92)	9.1 (0.36)	6.0 (0.24)	381.5 (15.02)
Average precipitation days (≥ 1.0 mm)	3.0	1.8	1.4	1.4	4.2	10.8	13.3	12.2	11.5	6.0	2.6	2.0	70.2
Average relative humidity (%)	46.7	41.6	34.2	31.0	37.8	57.3	67.4	67.8	72.7	61.0	52.7	47.6	51.5
Mean monthly sunshine hours	218.4	223.6	246.4	240.0	271.9	223.6	221.4	212.1	187.0	215.8	241.3	202.3	2,703.8
Source 1: NOAA (sun 1961–1990)
Source 2: Servicio Meteorologico Nacional (extremes)

=== Economy ===
The most important sectors of the municipal economy are mining, which employs about 21% of the population, livestock to which 76% of the surface area is dedicated and commerce, which employs over 70% of the population. Most mining today occurs on the Panuco, Vetagrande and Morelos mountains with the most active mines being El Compas, La Gallega, San Panuncio and San Rafael. Annual production is valued at 50,043 pesos for gold, 11,320 pesos for silver and 38,122 for lead. Non-metallic minerals include kaolin, building stone and petroleum aggregates. Agriculture and livestock is mostly done communally, with ten established ejidos. Only 15% of the municipality's land is farmed. This agriculture is dependent on the annual rainy season and produces some basic staples such as beans, chili peppers and corn. Livestock includes cattle, pigs, sheep, goats and horses. There is some industry related to food processing, textiles, wood products, paper and mining equipment as well as the making of crafts such as sarapes, stonework, leather and precious metals. Commerce is divided between providing for local needs as well as tourism. In addition to the city's status as a World Heritage site, there is camping available in the Sierra de Organos, Canon de Juchipila, the Cerro del Mixton and the Sierra de Cardos. La Quemada or Alta Vista-Chalchihuites is the best known archeological site in Zacatecas. Due to its location, the artifacts show influence of cultures such as Teotihuacan, the Purépechas and the Toltecs. It has several levels and built over a large hill. When it rains, water flows over the upper levels like a waterfall.

== Sports ==
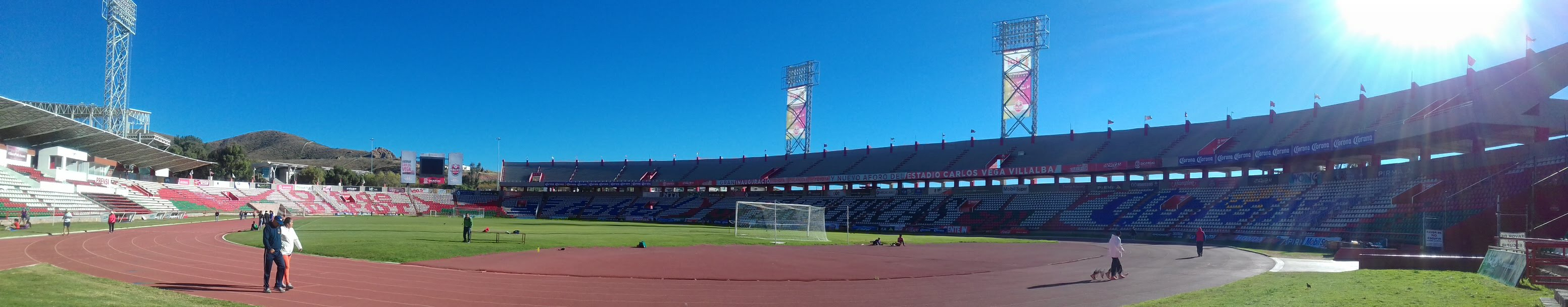
Estadio Carlos Vega Villalba

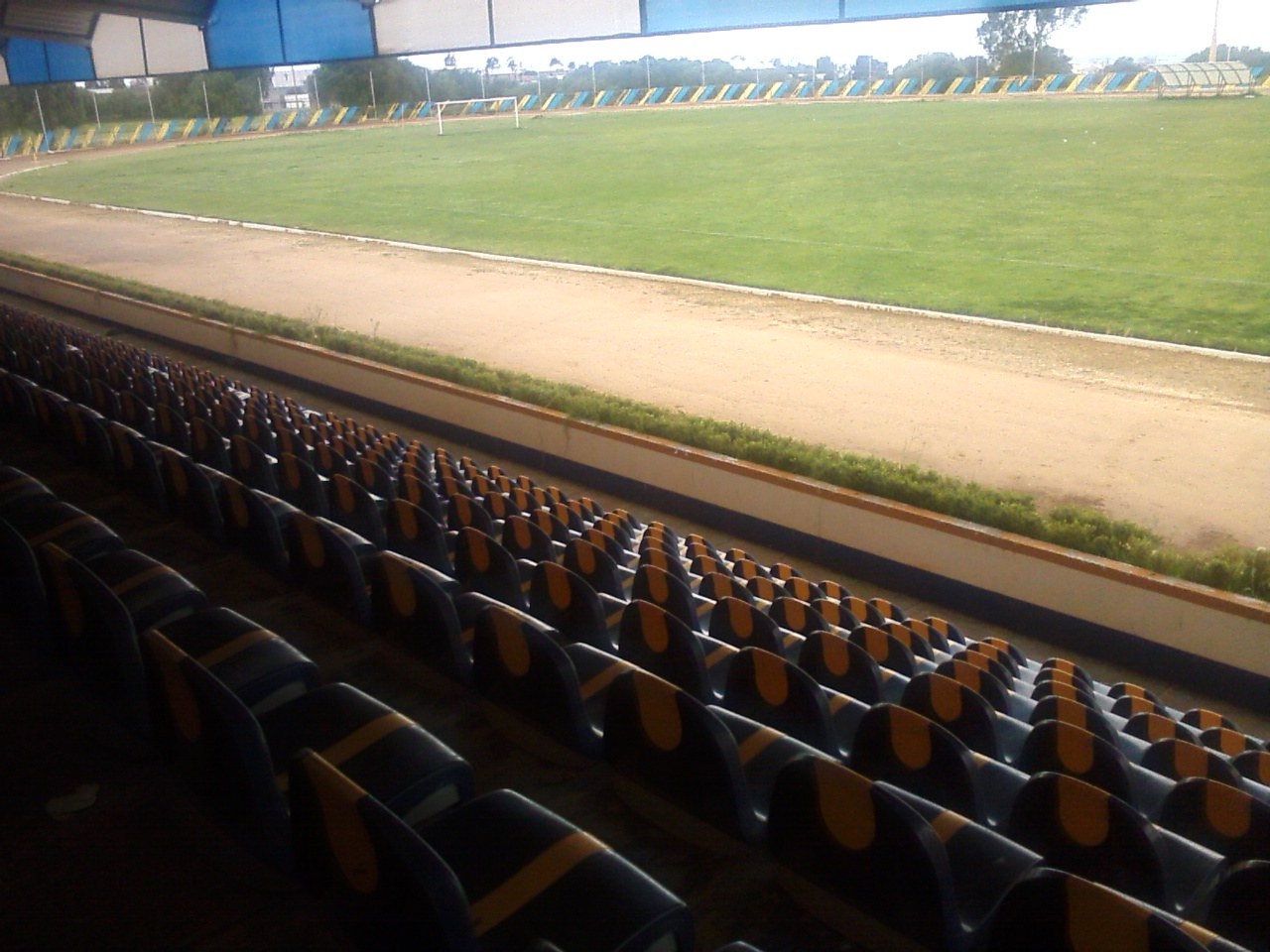
UAZ stadium

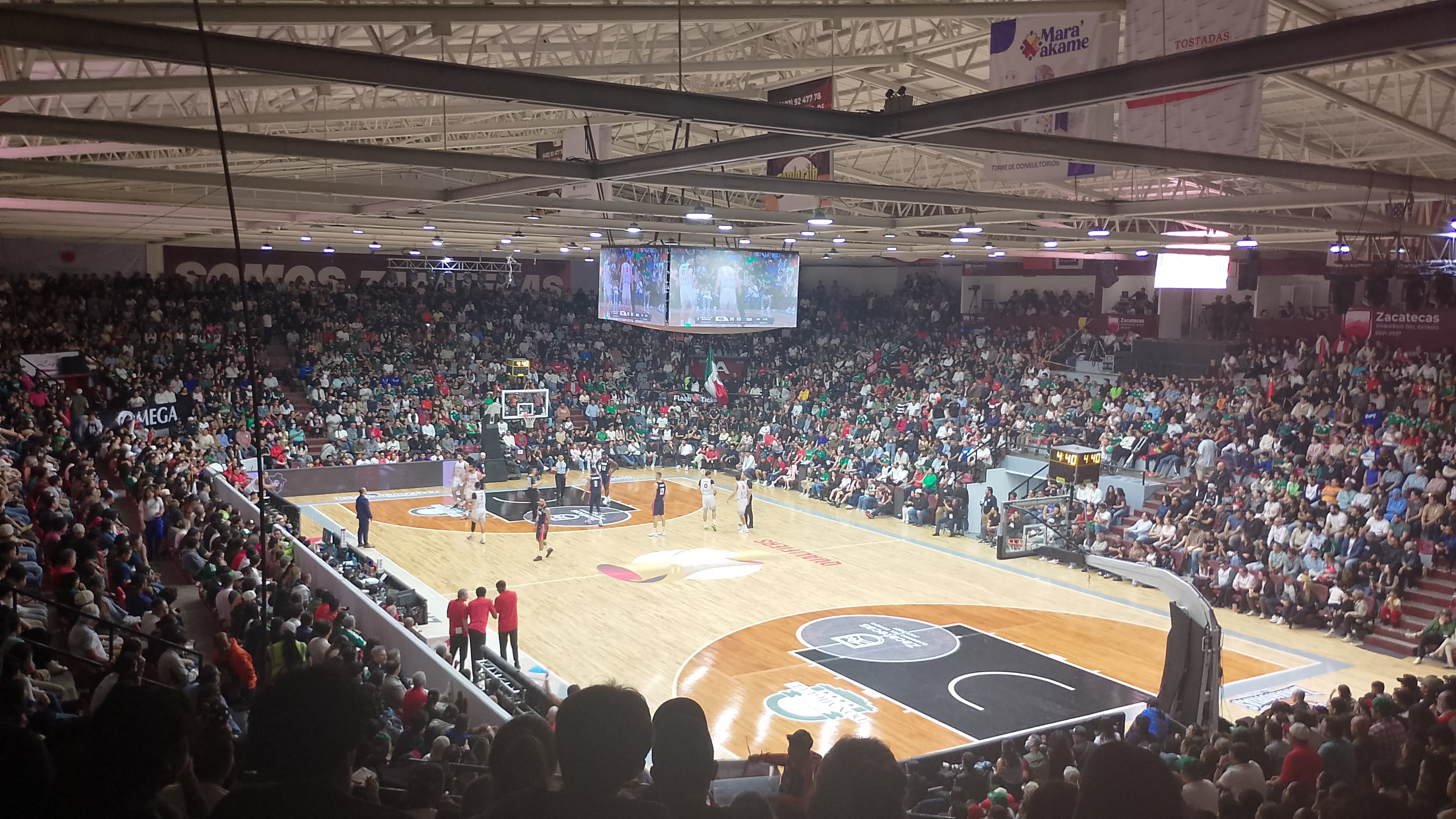
A Mexican National basketball team game in Zacatecas. July 6, 2026

Club	Sport	Founded	League
Mineros de Zacatecas (basketball)	Basketball	2017	LNBP
Mineros de Zacatecas	Football	2014	Ascenso MX
Tuzos de la UAZ	Football	2006	Serie A

== Twin towns – sister cities ==
Zacatecas has these sister cities:

- Azusa, California, United States
- El Paso, Texas, United States
- Málaga, Andalusia, Spain
- Santa Fe, New Mexico, United States
- Wichita, Kansas, United States
- Norwalk, California, United States
- Hanover Township, Illinois, United States
- Memphis, Tennessee, United States
- Woodstock, Illinois, United States

== Notable people ==
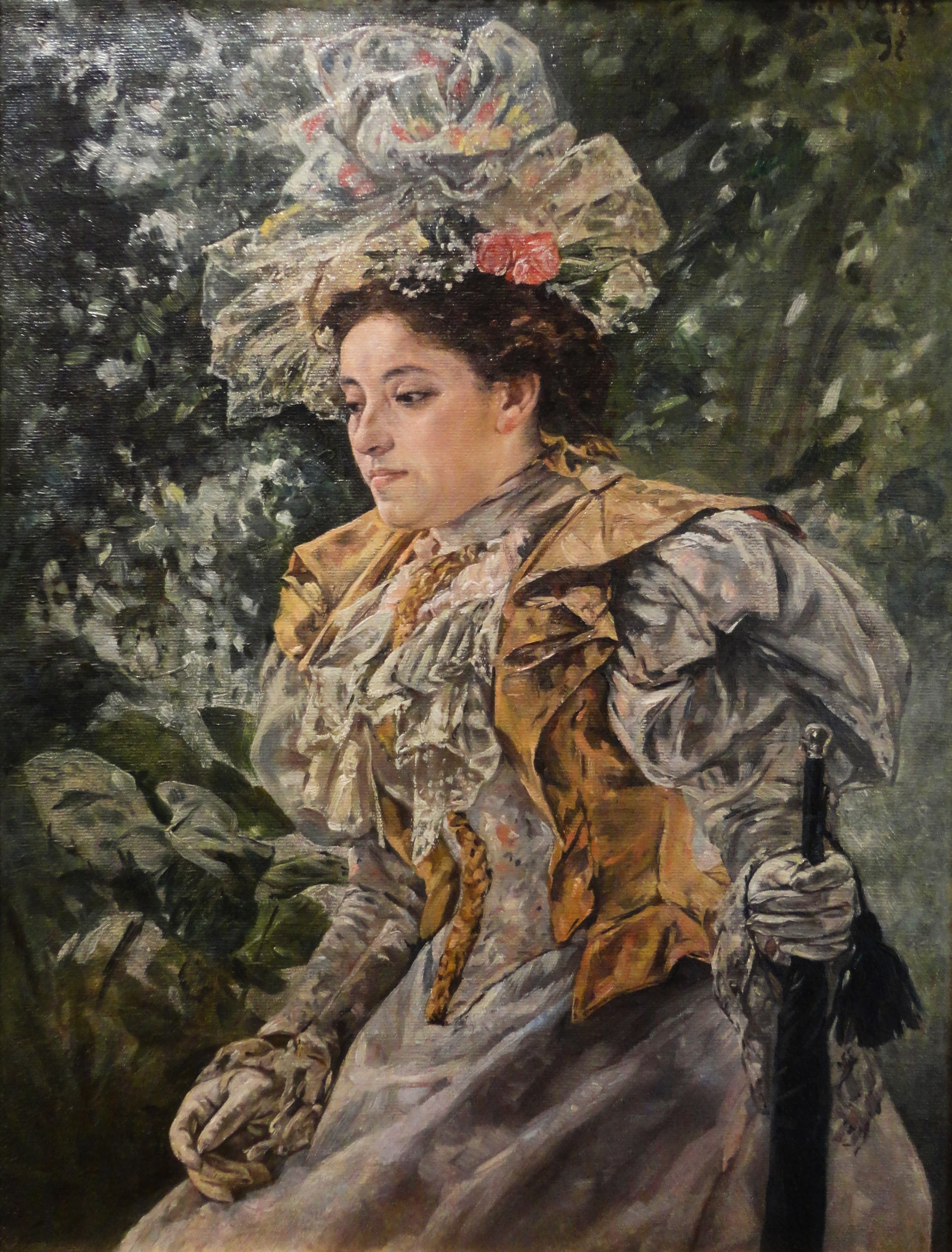
Margarita Ruelas Suárez en traje propio para salir, 1897 - Julio Ruelas.

- Juan de Tolosa (1515-1594) – Conquistador. Cofounder of Zacatecas, husband of Leonor Cortés Moctezuma.
- Juan de Oñate (1550–1626) – Mexican conquistador. Born in Zacatecas, husband of Isabel de Tolosa Cortés de Moctezuma. Led expeditions to New Mexico and Colorado and the Acoma massacre.
- Fray Antonio Margil de Jesús (1657-1726) – Friar. Born in Spain, founder of several missions in Guatemala, Querétaro, Zacatecas and Texas.
- Víctor Rosales (1776-1817) – Mexican war of independence hero..
- Francisco García Salinas (1786-1841) – Politician. Governor of Zacatecas, interim President of Mexico.
- Pedro Vélez (1787-1848) – President of Mexico from December 23 to December 31,1829.
- Jesús González Ortega (1822-1881) – Military and politician. Governor and commander against French Intervention.
- Genaro Codina (1852-1901) – Musician. Composer of the iconic March of Zacatecas.
- Refugio Reyes Rivas (1862-1943) – Architect. The most prolific Mexican architect in the Bajío during the late 19th and early 20th centuries.
- Julio Ruelas (1870-1907) – Artist from the Symbolism school.
- Manuel M. Ponce (1882-1948) – Musician. Composer from the late Romantic and Impressionist periods.
- Ramón López Velarde (1888-1921) – Poet. Modernist writer, regarded as Mexico's national poet.
- Enrique Estrada Reynoso (1890-1942) – Military and politician. Participant of the Mexican Revolution.
- Manuel Felguérez (1928-2020) – Artist. Plastic artist from the abstract art school.
