= Ahumada =

== Places ==
- Ahumada Tarifa Forrest in Cadiz Andalusia
- Calle Ahumada in Cadiz Andalusia
- Ahumada, Mexico

== Medicine ==
- Ahumada-DelCastillo Syndrome
- Ahumada South American Walgreens Boots Alliance Subsidiary

== Surname ==
Ahumada is a Spanish surname.

=== Notable people ===
A listing of notable people who share the 'Ahumada' surname, segregated by century and embellished with country of birth to provide a view on the distribution of the surname over time and geography. This listing should be maintained as comprehensive.

Born after 1900

- Spain: José Martínez Ahumada (José Martínez "Limeño"; 1936–2015), Spanish bullfighter
- Argentina: Carlos Ahumada (born 1964); emigrated to Mexico at age 11
- Argentina: Oscar Ahumada (born 1982)
- U.S.A.: Daniel Ahumada (born 1990)
- Mexico: Daniel Ahumada (born 1990)

==== Compound surnames: "de" ====
Born after 1700

- Spain: Agustín de Ahumada y Villalón, Marquis of Amarillas (1715–1760); emigrated to region of New Spain contiguous with modern Mexico c.1755

==== Compound surnames: "y" ====
Born after 1500

- Spain: Teresa of Ávila (born 'Teresa de Cepeda y Ahumada' 1515–1582)
- Spain: Agustín De Cepeda y Ahumada (1527–1591)
- Spanish Empire (present-day Ecuador): Teresa de Ahumada (born 'Teresa de Cepeda y Fuentes', 1566–1610)
- Spain: Urban de Ahumada y Guerrero. Marqués de Monte-Alto. 1732.

Born after 1900

- Mexico: Ernesto Corripio y Ahumada (1919–2008)
