= Barbara Mujica =

Barbara Mujica may refer to:

- Bárbara Mujica (writer), American novelist, short story writer and critic
- Bárbara Mujica (1944–1990), Argentine actress
