= Agustín De Cepeda y Ahumada =

Agustín de Ahumada

Personal details
- Born: 1527 Gotarrendura, Crown of Castile
- Died: 1591 (aged 63–64)
- Relatives: Teresa of Ávila (sister)

Military service
- Allegiance: Habsburg Monarchy
- Rank: Captain
- Battles/wars: Arauco War

Agustín de Ahumada (1527–1591) was a Castilian military officer who took part in the Arauco War.

== Life ==
He was born in Gotarrendura. His elder sister Teresa became a Carmelite mystic nun (and was eventually canonized as a Catholic saint). He fought in Chile against the Mapuche and earned fame when in 1566 he was entrusted with the defense of the Plaza of Cañete with only limited resources.

At that time, the fort had rudimentary defences, scarce munitions along with only two cannons and mostly inexperienced soldiers. The Mapuche, aware of the camps frailties, got a considerable number together under the orders of their leaders Loble and Millalelmo. They prepared an attack in which they anticipated to triumph easily. Captain Cepeda found out from friendly Mapuche that his enemy was advancing on the plaza, and so he locked up his people, his livestock and his horses in the fort that they had at the edge of the river, and got in position to defend himself there until he received help to take the offensive.

The artillery and arquebus fire produced a great disturbance among the Mapuche. When they saw that taking the fort would be a more arduous task than expected, they set fire to the few houses and shed that they had reached in the town and situated themselves strategically to blockade the fort and keep its defenders hungry. When further groups of Spanish soldiers came as reinforcements, the Mapuche attackers moved away from the area.

== Books ==
(in Spanish)

- Historia jeneral de Chile by Diego Barros Arana

(in Spanish)

- Lebu: de la Leufumapu a su centenario, 1540-1962 By José Alejandro Pizarro Soto
