= Saint Teresa of Ávila's Vision of the Holy Spirit (Cambridge) =

Painting by Peter Paul Rubens

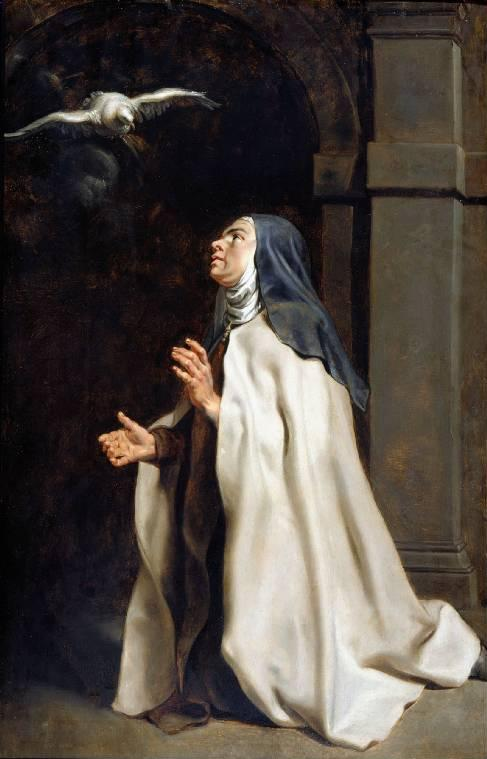
Saint Teresa of Ávila's Vision of the Holy Spirit (c. 1614) by Rubens

Saint Teresa of Ávila's Vision of the Holy Spirit is an oil on panel painting of Teresa of Avila by Peter Paul Rubens, executed c. 1614, now in the Fitzwilliam Museum in Cambridge, to which it was allocated by the UK Government in 1999 after being accepted in lieu of inheritance tax. It is one of three versions Rubens produced of the subject, the others are in Rotterdam and a private collection.

The Cambridge work is portrayed in the background of David Teniers the Younger's studio in his Studio of a Painter around 1650 and Pierre van Schuppen produced a print after it around the same time It was later owned by the Prince de Ligne, from whose collection it was sold in Paris in 1843. It appeared in two other auctions in the 19th century, but its whereabouts were unknown as of 1973
