= Mental prayer =

Form of prayer

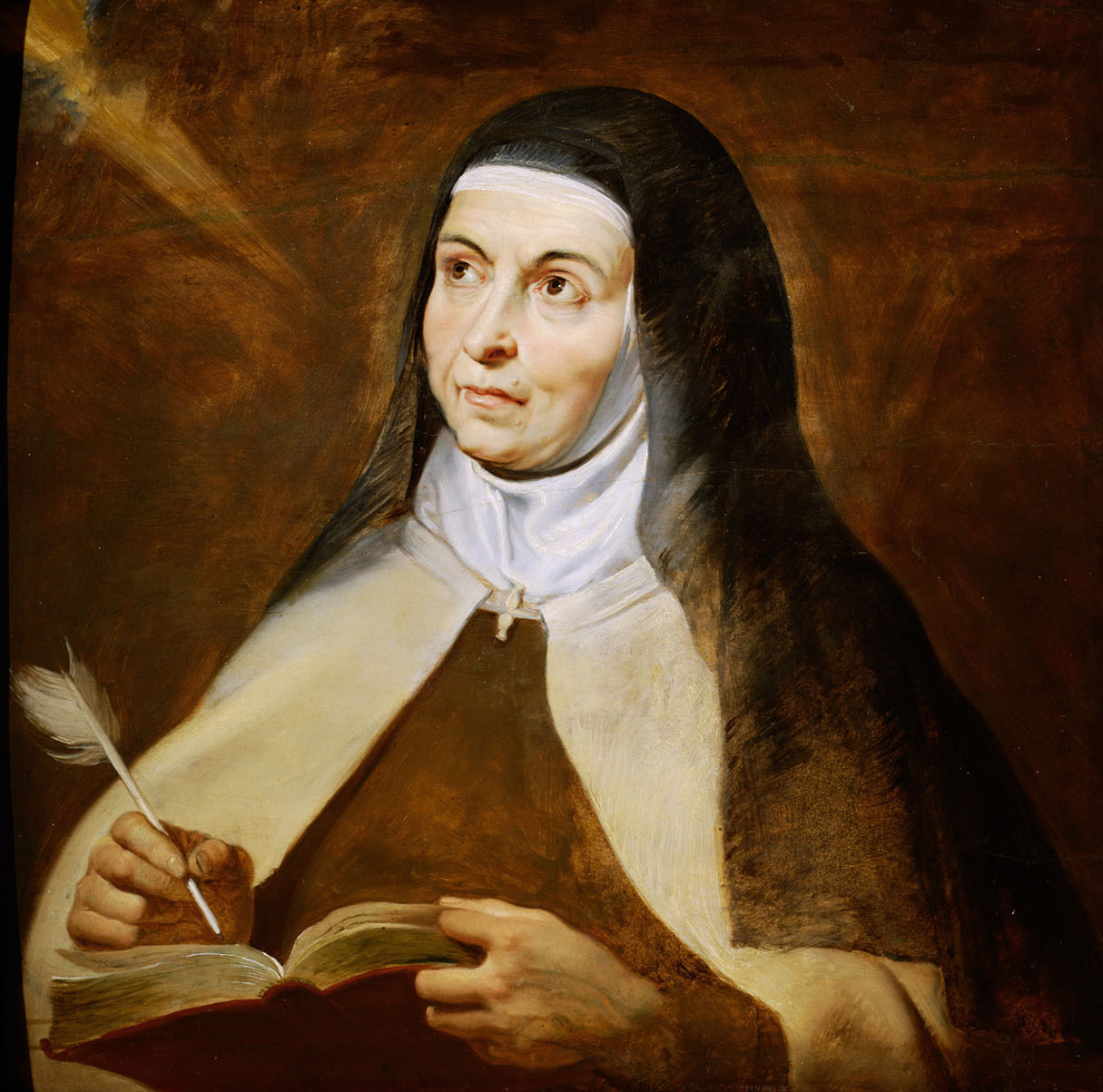
Teresa of Ávila

Mental prayer is a form of meditational prayer, "performed without aid of any particular formula." It is distinguished from vocal prayers, "prayers performed by means of a given formula." The aim of mental prayer is 'to inflame souls with the love of God' and 'live without sin'. In mystical practice, it is to be followed-up by contemplative prayer.

== Definition ==
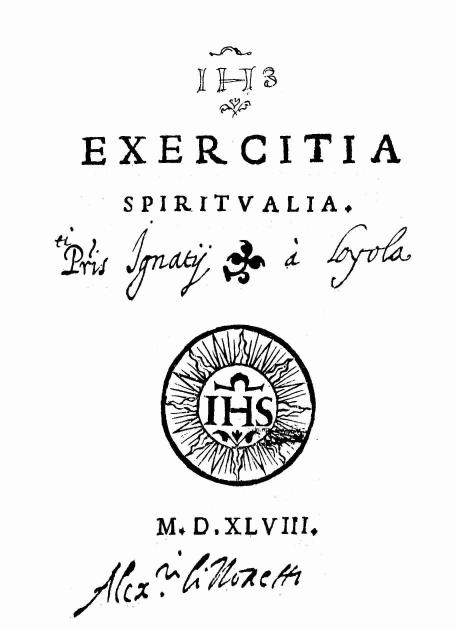
Spiritual Exercises of Ignatius of Loyola, 1548

Mental prayer is a form of prayer "performed without aid of any particular formula." It is distinguished from vocal prayers, "prayers performed by means of a given formula," Prayer is mental when the thoughts and affections of the soul are not expressed in a previously determined formula. (Note: Leen, Edward, Progress Through Mental Prayer)

According to John Hardon, mental prayer is a "form of prayer in which the sentiments expressed are one's own and not those of another person. Mental prayer is accomplished by internal acts of the mind and affections and is either simple meditation or contemplation." According to Adolphe Tanquerey, vocal prayer is expressed by words or gestures, while mental prayer "takes place wholly within the soul." According to Mother Teresa, "In vocal prayer we speak to God, in mental prayer he speaks to us. It is then that God pours himself into us."

According to Teresa of Ávila, mental prayer is meditational prayer, in which the person is like a gardener, who, with much labour, draws the water up from the depths of the well to water the plants and flowers. According to Teresa of Avila, mental prayer can proceed by using vocal prayers in order to improve dialogue with God. According to Lehodey, mental prayer can be divided into meditation, more active in reflections, and contemplation, more quiet and gazeful.

Some modern authors recommend that this prayer be called "interior prayer". Jacques Philippe:

It would be better to say interior prayer instead of mental prayer, because in our modern culture, the word "mental" is associated with thoughts – as something cerebral – whereas this form of prayer is more an affair of the heart, instead of reflection. St. Teresa of Avila said that it is not an act of thinking much, but of loving much.

== Mental prayer in Catholic Orders ==
=== Teresa of Ávila - nine grades of prayer ===
Among the Carmelites, there was no regulation for mental prayer until Teresa of Avila (1515–1582) introduced it, practicing it for two hours daily. According to Jordan Aumann, Teresa of Ávila distinguishes nine grades of prayer: (1) vocal prayer, (2) mental prayer or prayer of meditation, (3) affective prayer, (4) prayer of simplicity, or acquired contemplation or recollection, (5) infused contemplation or recollection, (6) prayer of quiet, (7) prayer of union, (8) prayer of conforming union, and (9) prayer of transforming union. "The first four grades belong to the predominantly ascetical stage of spiritual life; the remaining five grades are infused prayer and belong to the mystical phase of spiritual life."

=== Other orders ===
From before the middle of the twelfth century, the Carthusians had times set apart for mental prayer. Early in the sixteenth century, the Dominican chapter of Milan prescribed mental prayer for half an hour during the morning and the evening. Among the Franciscans, there is mention of methodical mental prayer about the middle of that century. In the mid-sixteenth century Ignatius of Loyola in his Spiritual Exercises, which he used with laypersons, taught methods of both meditating on one's life and of contemplating the Gospel accounts of Jesus' life, as a means of becoming more like Christ. His method and that of Sulpice have helped spread the habit of meditating beyond the cloister.

== Practice ==
=== Aim ===
"Friendly dealing" (tratar de amistad) is the literal translation of Teresa's definition of mental prayer, "Tratar de amistad, estando muchas veces tratando a solas con Quien sabemos nos ama.": "Friendly dealing, many times dealing one-on-one with Him whom we know loves us. And this person has a face which we can contemplate, a face that is a singular manifestation of his person." The Catechism of the Catholic Church quotes Teresa of Ávila as stating: "Contemplative [sic] (Note: Mental prayer, "oración mental," is meditative prayer, not contemplative prayer; contemplation follows after it. Wallenfang & Wallenfang (2021): "The second stage of prayer is called mental prayer or the prayer of meditation.") prayer [oración mental] is nothing else than a close sharing between friends; it means taking time frequently to be alone with him who we know loves us."

Alphonsus Liguori (1696–1787), in his work Necessity and Power of Prayer, The Great Means of Salvation and Perfection, explained: "Mental prayer is the blessed furnace in which souls are inflamed with the love of God. All the saints have become saints by mental prayer." Recommending its importance, he said: "It is morally impossible for him who neglects meditation to live without sin." He added that, because of its incompatibility with sin, nobody can continue the practice of mental prayer in the state of mortal sin. They will either repent or quit the practice of mental prayer. He saw it as a means of making available the graces needed for a persevering faith. "He who neglects mental prayer," affirms Teresa of Avila, "needs no devil to carry him to hell. He brings himself there with his own hands." Her fellow Carmelite John of the Cross also said, "Without the aid of mental prayer, the soul cannot triumph over the forces of the demon."

=== Topics for mental prayer ===
According to Jordan Aumann, "meditation is the reasoned discursus on some supernatural truth, meaning any truth related to God and the spiritual life." Subjects of meditation can be "some scene or mystery from the life of Christ, the life and virtues of Mary or the saints, a particular virtue to be acquired or vice to be uprooted, a truth from dogmatic theology, such as the attributes of God or the indwelling of the Trinity, the prayers and actions of the sacraments, the Mass, and the liturgy."

=== Method ===
According to Jordan Aumann, "a basic framework" contains the following three elements: "consideration of some supernatural truth, application of that truth to one's life, and the resolution to do something about it." He gives the following detailed overview of the Carmelite method:

- Introduction
  - preparation
  - reading
- Meditation
  - imaginative representation of material
  - reflection or meditation properly so called
  - affective colloquy or conversation with God
- Conclusion
  - thanksgiving
  - oblation
  - petition

Francis of Sales advised: "Begin all prayer, whether mental or vocal, by an act of the Presence of God. If you observe this rule strictly, you will soon see how useful it is." He says that God is everywhere and is in our hearts and souls. Thus, "a blind man when in the presence of his prince will preserve a reverential attitude if told that the king is there, although unable to see him."

=== Duration ===
The recommended length of time per day varies from "a few minutes" (FriarsMinor.org), "30 minutes" (Eugene Boylan), "several minutes" (Josemaria Escriva), "one hour" (Francis of Sales), "minimum of half an hour in front of the Blessed Sacrament" (Alphonsus Liguori).

== See also ==
- Centering prayer
- Jesus Prayer
- Interior life
- Morning Offering
- Thanksgiving after Communion
- Rosary
- Spiritual reading
- Angelus
- Memorare
- Personal relationship with Jesus Christ
- Visit to the Blessed Sacrament
- Examination of conscience
- Power of Christian prayer

== Sources ==
Printed sources

- Hollenback, Jess Byron (1996), Mysticism: Experience, Response, and Empowerment, Penn State Press
- Lehodey, Domitry Vitalis (1912). The Ways of Mental Prayer. Dublin: M.H.Gill.
- Liguori, Alphonsus (1759), "The Great Means of Salvation and of Perfection by Saint Alphonsus Liguori", www.basilica.ca
- Simler, Joseph (2009), Catechism of Mental Prayer, TAN Books
- Teresa of Avila (2007). The Way of Perfection. Translated by Benedictines of Stanbrook. Cosimo, Inc. ISBN 978-1-60206-261-0.
- Wallenfang, Donald; Wallenfang, Megan (2021), Shoeless: Carmelite Spirituality in a Disquieted World, Wipf and Stock Publishers
- Wyhe, Cordula van (2008), Female Monasticism in Early Modern Europe: An Interdisciplinary View, Ashgate Publishing, Ltd

Web-sources
