= Saint Teresa of Ávila's Vision of the Holy Spirit =

Painting by Peter Paul Rubens

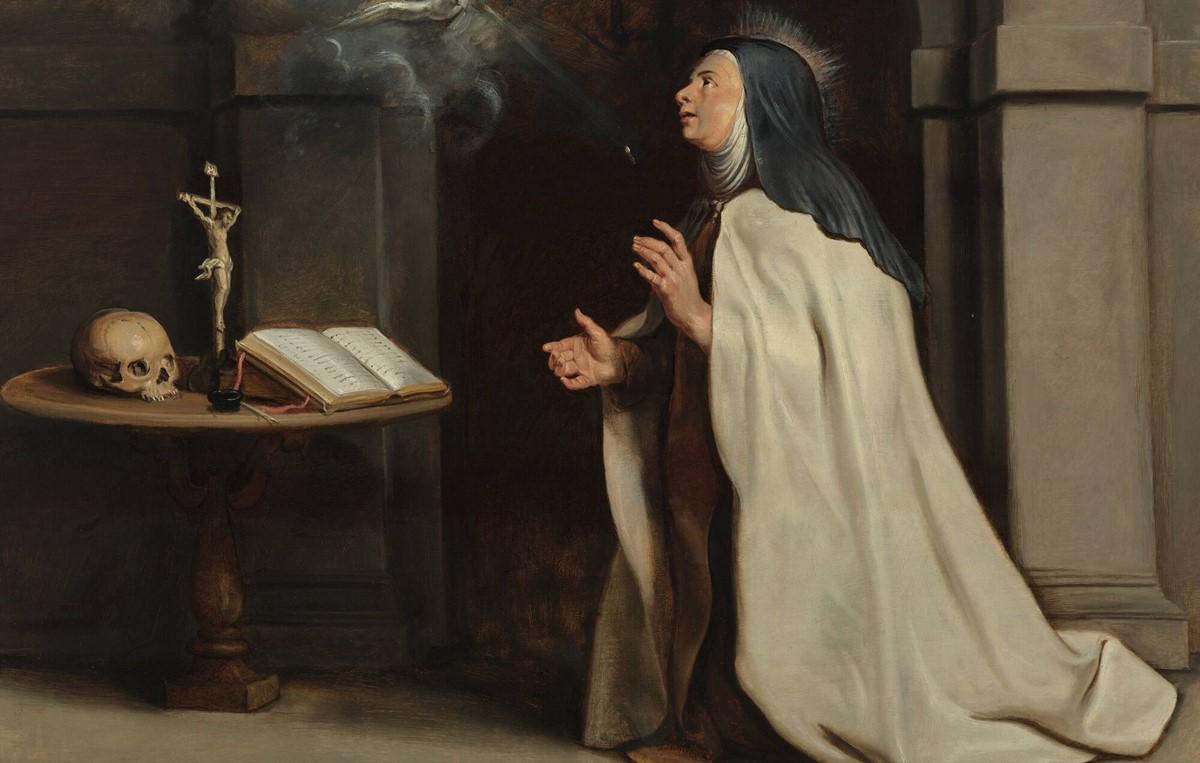
Saint Teresa of Ávila's Vision of the Holy Spirit (1612–1614) by Rubens

Saint Teresa of Ávila's Vision of the Holy Spirit is a 1612-1614 painting by Peter Paul Rubens. It is now in the Museum Boijmans Van Beuningen in Rotterdam.

It shows a vision described by Teresa of Avila in her autobiography and (with two other versions in a private collection and at the Fitzwilliam Museum in Cambridge) is one of three surviving versions of the subject by the artist.

== Bibliography ==
- Vlieghe, Hans, Saints (Corpus Rubenianum Ludwig Burchard, 8), nr. 152, Arcade, Brussel, 1972
- Jansen, Guido M.C., De verzameling van de Stichting Willem van der Vorm in het Museum Boymans-van Beuningen Rotterdam = Collection of the Willem van der Vorm Foundation at the Boymans Museum Rotterdam, nr. 5, Museum Boijmans Van Beuningen, Rotterdam, 1994
- de Poorter, Nora, Rubens en zijn tijd, Museum Boijmans Van Beuningen, Rotterdam, 1996, 18
