= Sister Teresa =

Historical novel by Bárbara Mujica

- Author: Bárbara Mujica
- Language: English
- Genre: Historical fiction
- Published: 2007
- Publication place: United States
- Media type: Print
- Pages: 384
- ISBN: 978-1-58567-834-1

Sister Teresa: The Woman Who Became Saint Teresa of Avila is a historical novel by Bárbara Mujica, published in 2007 by Overlook. The novel is narrated by a fictional nun, Angélica del Sagrado Corazón, who recalls the life of her friend, Teresa de Cepeda y Ahumada, who was canonized as Saint Teresa of Ávila in 1622.

== Background ==
Bárbara Mujica is an Emeritus Professor of Spanish at Georgetown University whose scholarly focus includes Teresa of Ávila and other early modern women. Her nonfiction books include Teresa de Avila, Lettered Woman (2009), and Women Religious and Epistolary Exchange in the Carmelite Reform: The Disciples of Teresa de Avila (2020).

In an Early Modern Women journal review of Women Warriors in Early Modern Spain: A Tribute to Bárbara Mujica, an essay collection that honors Mujica for her scholarly work, Elizabeth Franklin Lewis notes her novels and short fiction, stating "most notable in the context of this volume is her novel Sister Teresa (2007)."

== Reception ==
In a review for Booklist, Margaret Flanagan writes, "Teresa's multitextured story unfolds in sumptuous panels, from her pampered girlhood to her interrogation during the height of the Spanish Inquisition" and "Combining elements of fact and fiction, Mujica is able to paint a portrait of Teresa as a full-blooded woman rather than a plaster saint." Publishers Weekly writes that Mujica "presents Teresa as a very human saint-in-the-making: by turns coquettish, self-loathing, desperately ill, politically masterful, blisteringly witty and, above all, God-obsessed."

According to Kirkus Reviews, "because Angélica is writing for posterity—for a future audience that might not know much about convent life or Catholic theology—the reader is treated to Angélica's concise, matter-of-fact lessons on such matters as the reforms of the Council of Trent and the differences between Carmelites and Jesuits, material that a lesser historical novelist might turn into painfully improbable expository dialogue."

In America, Keith J. Egan praises the novel, while also noting Mujica "emphasizes a kind of anti-hagiography, in which she puts Teresa's humanity front and center. Some devotees of Teresa will no doubt find the earthy and sometimes crude language in this novel off-putting."

In a review for Library Journal, Mary Margaret Benson writes that the book "suffers from some serious flaws. The eroticism and lesbianism are laid on rather thickly and the abundance of late 20th-century colloquialisms (e.g., "bullshit," "swishy," "stickler for detail") are distracting; nor is Teresa's feminism believable." In a review for the Washingtonian, Emily Bratcher writes, "Angelica's comfortable, honest voice makes it easy to relate to this intimate novel's central themes: a siblinglike love-hate relationship, forbidden sexual attraction, the struggle to find and keep faith, and the miracle of salvation."

== Adaptation ==
The novel was adapted into the play God's Gypsy by playwright Coco Blignaut at The Actors Studio in collaboration with Mujica. A review by Shari Barett for Broadway World describes the play as "a bold, sexy and humanizing portrait of the 16th century mystic who became one of the most controversial reformers of the Catholic Church." For The Los Angeles Times, Margaret Gray writes that the script "tries to cover too much material."
