= Bárbara Mujica (writer) =

American academic and writer

- Citizenship: American
- Occupations: Scholar, novelist, short story writer, literary critic and academic

Academic background
- Education: University of California at Los Angeles; Middlebury Graduate Program in France, Sorbonne; New York University)

Academic work
- Institutions: Georgetown University
- Notable works: Frida; Sister Teresa; Miss del Río
- Website: www.barbaramujica.com

Bárbara Louise Mujica is an American scholar, novelist, short story writer, literary critic, and academic. She is an Emeritus Professor of Spanish at Georgetown University. Her novels include Frida (2001), Sister Teresa (2007), and Miss del Río (2022).

Mujica's work spans historical fiction, theater, mysticism, women's writing, early modern Spanish literature, and Latin American culture. Her authored works include essays, short stories and novels, such as Frida, Sister Teresa, and Miss del Río. Her work has been supported by grants from institutions such as the Spanish Government, Poets & Writers of New York, and Georgetown University. She has also received several awards, including first place in E.L. Doctorow Fiction Competition for her story Mitrani, the 2015 Maryland Writers' Association National Fiction Competition for her story Jason's Cap, and second place in the ScreenCraft Cinematic Novel Contest for Miss del Río.

== Early life and education ==
Mujica attended the University of California at Los Angeles for her undergraduate education, and studied French literature. She then attended University of Paris at the Sorbonne through the Middlebury Graduate Program for an M.A. in French. She completed her doctorate at New York University in Spanish literature.

== Career ==
As a professor, she published widely on early modern Spanish literature, in particular, mysticism, women's writing, and theater. Mujica's writing career began with short stories. Mujica was on the board of directors for the Washington Review from 1994 through 1998.

Mujica directed the theater group El Retablo and was the founding editor of Comedia Performance, a journal focused on early modern theater, which she edited for 18 years. In addition, she served as President of the Association for Hispanic Classical Theater. From 2003 to 2006, she was a judge for the Helen Hayes Awards, and she has also been an active member of the board of the GALA Hispanic Theater. In 2022 she was appointed as an Abby Freeman Artist-in-Residence at the Braid Theater. Furthermore, she contributed to Américas, the cultural magazine of the Organization of American States, as its book review editor, publishing over 130 reviews and interviews with Latin American authors. At Georgetown University, she played a key role in supporting student veterans. She served as the first faculty adviser for the Georgetown University Student Veterans Association and was also the Associate Facilitator of the Veterans Support Team, which aimed to make the campus more veteran-friendly. She currently serves on the advisory board of the Military and Veterans Resource Center (MAVRC).

In 2019, an essay collection was published to honor her scholarly work, titled Women Warriors in Early Modern Spain: A Tribute to Bárbara Mujica. In 2022, her study Women Religious and Epistolary Exchange was awarded the GEMELA (Grupo de Estudios sobre la Mujer en España y las Américas) Prize for best scholarly book of the year on early modern Hispanic women.

== Media coverage ==
Mujica's works have received media attention, with features in publications such as The Miami Herald and The New York Times.

=== Works ===
Mujica has authored publications, including novels, essays, and short stories. Her first novel, The Deaths of Don Bernardo, was published in 1990. In 2002, she published Frida, which was later translated into seventeen languages. The novel explored Frida Kahlo's life, art, and relationships within the cultural and political context of early 20th-century Mexico. In Sister Teresa, later adapted for the stage at the Actors' Studio in Los Angeles, she depicted the spiritual awakening of Saint Teresa of Ávila during the Spanish Inquisition, addressing themes of faith, societal expectations, and personal growth. In I Am Venus, a winner of the Maryland Writers Association National Competition, she explored Velázquez's rise to fame through the eyes of his model for The Toilet of Venus, examining the intersection of art, scandal, and political turmoil in 17th-century Spain. Carrie Callaghan, writing in the Washington Independent Review of Books, praised it as a detailed and engaging novel that vividly captures the intrigue of Velázquez’s life, art, and 17th-century Spain, using literary misdirection and evocative storytelling to explore themes of love, ambition, and illusion. Mujica's collection of short stories, Imagining Iraq, published in 2021, is based on stories veterans have told her. Kirkus Reviews called it "authentic and affecting."

Mujica's novel, Miss del Río, is a fictional account of the life of Mexican actress Dolores del Río, tracing her rise to Hollywood stardom, personal struggles, and the challenges of fame, identity, and prejudice. Carol Memmott of The Washington Post called it "an alluring portrait of the dazzling del Río." The Post called it one of the five best recent historical novels in 2022.

Mujica also wrote on early modern literature and theater, with books including Teresa de Ávila, Lettered Woman, Shakespeare and the Spanish Comedia, A New Anthology of Early Modern Spanish Theater: Play and Playtext, Women Writers of Early Modern Spain, Early Modern Spanish Theater, and Staging and Stage Décor: Perspectives on European Theater 1500-1950. She also wrote award-winning stories, such as Jason's Cap, Ox, and Imagining Iraq. Her 2021 book Collateral Damage: Women Write about War highlighted women's wartime experiences as victims, resisters, and participants, revealing the overlooked emotional, social, and physical tolls of conflict on women and children worldwide.

== Awards and honors ==
- 2015 – First Prize, Maryland Writers' Association National Fiction Competition
- 2015 – Presidential Medal, Georgetown University
- 2016 – Dean’s Award for Excellence in Teaching, Georgetown University
- 2017 – Service Award, Georgetown University
- 2022 – ScreenCraft Cinematic Novel Competition, for Miss del Río
- 2022 – GEMELA Award, for Women Religious and Epistolary Exchange

== Bibliography ==
=== Books ===
==== Fiction ====
- The Deaths of Don Bernardo (1990) ISBN 9780915745142
- Sanchez Across the Street (1997) ISBN 9781877978753
- Frida (2002) ISBN 9780452283039
- Sister Teresa: The Woman Who Became Spain's Most Beloved Saint (2007) ISBN 9781585678341
- I Am Venus (2014) ISBN 9781468308907
- Imagining Iraq (2021) ISBN 9781953686015
- Miss del Río (2022) ISBN 9781525804991

==== Nonfiction ====
- Women Writers of Early Modern Spain: Sophia's Daughters (2004) ISBN 9780300092578
- Espiritualidad y feminismo: Santa Teresa de Jesús (2006) ISBN 9788479233754
- Teresa de Ávila, Lettered Woman (2009) ISBN 9780826516312
- Shakespeare and the Spanish Comedia (2013) ISBN 9781611485172
- A New Anthology of Early Modern Spanish Theater: Play and Playtext (2015) ISBN 9780300109566
- Women Religious and Epistolary Exchange in the Carmelite Reform: The Disciples of Teresa de Avila (2020) ISBN 9789463723435

=== Selected articles ===
- Mujica, B. (1999). Golden Age/Early Modern theater: Comedia studies at the end of the century. Hispania, 82(3), 397–407.
- Mujica, B. (2001). Beyond image: The apophatic-kataphatic dialectic in Teresa de Ávila. Hispania, 84(4), 741–748.
- Mujica, B. (2007). María de Zayas on the Washington stage: Interview with Karen Berman. Comedia Performance, 4(1), 217–232.
- Mujica, B. (2008). “Performing Sanctity: Lope’s use of iconography in Santa Teresa de Jesús. A Companion to Lope de Vega. Ed. A. Sampson and J. Thacker. 183-198. ISBN 9781855661684
- Mujica, B. (2009). “Was Teresa of Ávila a feminist?” Approaches to Teaching Teresa of Ávila and the Spanish Mystics. Ed. A. Weber. (74-82). ISBN 9781603290234
- Mujica, B. (2013). Wisdom onstage: The evolution of sabiduría in Calderón's autos sacramentales. Bulletin of Spanish Studies, 90(5–6), 787–806.
- Mujica, B. (2014). Healing on the margins: Ana de San Bartolome, convent nurse. Early Modern Studies, 6, 1–20.
- Mujica, B. (2015). Lope de Vega’s El castigo sin venganza: What do viewers know and when do they know it? Comedia Performance, 12(1), 50–80.
- Mujica, B. (2023) “Finding refuge in your own castle: Teresa de Ávila’s Las Moradas (2023). Refugees, Refuge, and Human Displacement. Ed. I. López-Calvo and M. Agosín. 149-161. ISBN 9781839982484
