= El Pelayo =

- Village
- Location in the Province of Cádiz El Pelayo (Spain)
- Coordinates: 36°05′02″N 5°29′51″W
- Country: Spain
- Autonomous community: Andalusia
- Province: Cádiz
- Comarca: Campo de Gibraltar
- Municipality: Algeciras
- Judicial district: Algeciras

Population (2010)
  - Total: 867
- Time zone: UTC+1 (CET)
  - Summer (DST): UTC+2 (CEST)
- Official language(s): Spanish

El Pelayo or Pelayo is a village in the municipality of Algeciras in the Province of Cadiz in southeastern Spain, It is located 7 miles (11 km) southwest from the city centre, along the main road to the southern tip of Spain at Tarifa, which is 14 kilometres (8.7 mi) away. According to the National Statistics Institute, Pelayo had 867 inhabitants in 2010. Its economy is based on rural orchards and mills and it is one of the poorer areas of the municipality. The Guadiaro Palmones River flows in the vicinity and it is surrounded by trees and plants including ferns, oaks, alder, hornbeam, etc., and it is part of the Parque Natural de Los Alcornocales. Pelayo is along the bus route from Algeciras and Tarifa, with buses from the Transportes Generales Comes company.
