= Gotarrendura =

- Municipality
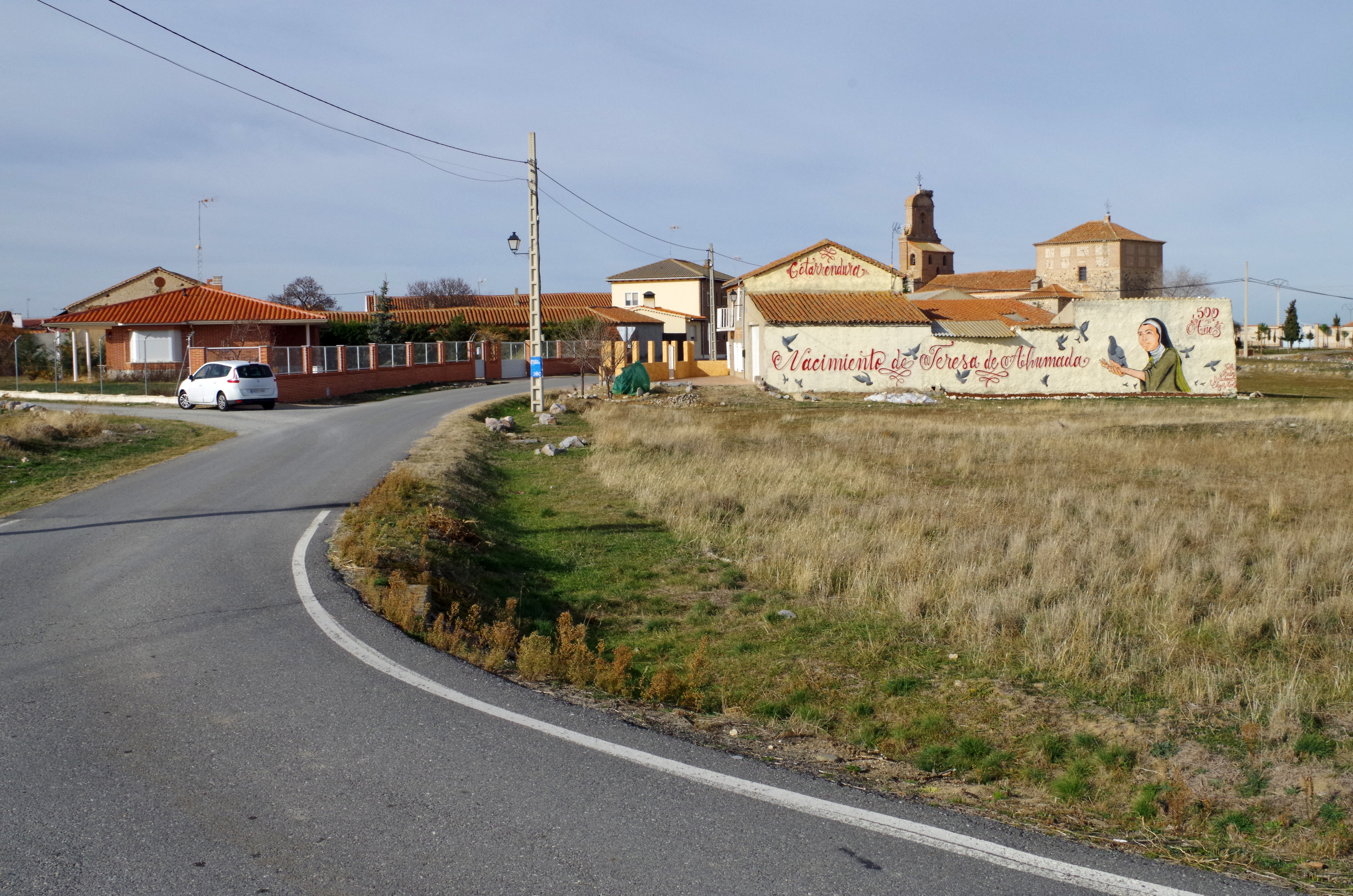

- Flag Coat of arms

- Location in Spain. Gotarrendura (Spain)
- Coordinates: 40°49′36″N 4°44′21″W
- Country: Spain
- Autonomous community: Castile and León
- Province: Ávila
- Municipality: Gotarrendura

Area
  - Total: 10.63 km^{2} (4.10 sq mi)
- Elevation: 931 m (3,054 ft)

Population (2025-01-01)
  - Total: 173
  - Density: 16.3/km^{2} (42.2/sq mi)
- Time zone: UTC+1 (CET)
  - Summer (DST): UTC+2 (CEST)
- Website: Official website

Gotarrendura is a municipality located in the province of Ávila, Castile and León, Spain.

The parents of St. Teresa of Ávila (1515–1582) married in the village and it has been suggested that the saint was born there.

== Population ==
Historical population
Year	Pop.	±% p.a.
2023	167	—
2024	167	+0.00%
2025	173	+3.59%
Source: INE

== Architecture and culture ==
The main buildings are the San Miguel Church, the Santa Teresa's dovecote and the López Berrón ethnographic museum.

Gotarrendura has won the International Award for Liveable Communities 2011 (Category A towns & cities popn up to 20,000) (award from the United Nations Environment Programme).
