= Teresa de Ahumada =

Spanish Discalced Carmelite nun

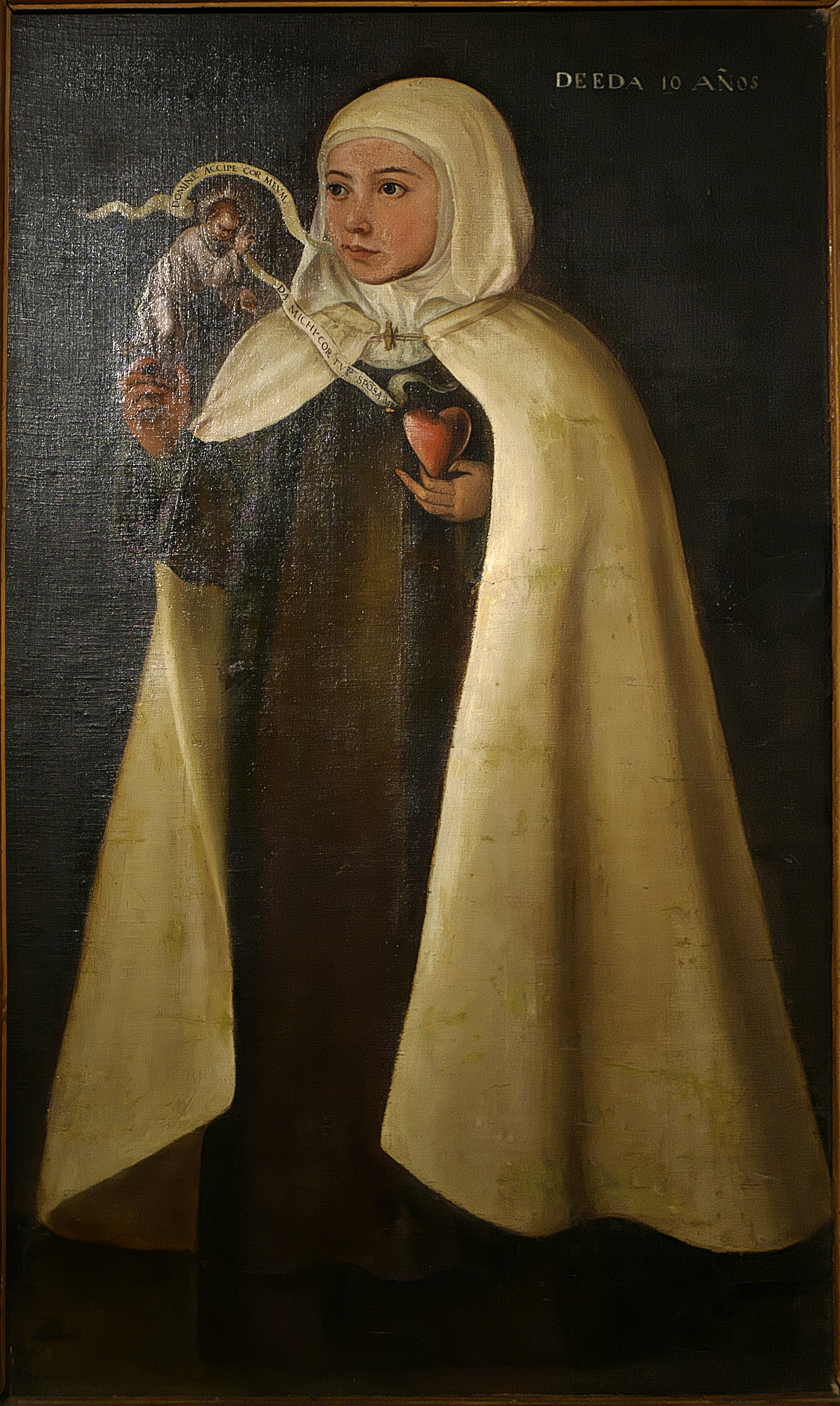
- Teresa de Cepeda y Fuentes portrayed as a child

Personal life
- Born: Teresa de Cepeda y Fuentes; 25 October 1566 Quito, Real Audiencia of Quito, Spanish Empire (now Ecuador)
- Died: 9 September 1610 (aged 43) Ávila, Spain
- Known for: The niece of Saint Teresa of Ávila, Teresa de Ahumada was the first American to become a Discalced Carmelite.
- Other names: Teresita; Teresa la Quiteña

Religious life
- Religion: Roman Catholic
- Institute: Discalced Carmelite

Teresa de Ahumada (née Teresa de Cepeda y Fuentes; nickname, "Teresita"; also known as Teresa la Quiteña; Quito, Real Audiencia of Quito, Spanish Empire, 25 October 1566–9 September 1610) was a Spanish Discalced Carmelite. She was one of the most prominent people in the family of Teresa of Ávila to be born in the Americas. Teresa de Ahumada's legacy lies in being the first American to follow in the footsteps of the reformed Carmelites.

== Early life ==
Teresa de Cepeda y Fuentes was born in Quito, 25 October 1566. Her father was Lorenzo de Cepeda y Ahumada and her mother was Juana de Fuentes y Espinosa. In Lorenzo's will, he determined that the family name of his daughter was to be: "Teresa de Ahumada". She was often referred to by a nickname, "Teresita" ("little Teresa"), alluding to her aunt Teresa de Jesus. Teresa de Ahumada's childhood was marked by the death of her mother on 14 November 1567, a year after the girl's birth. During her first nine years, Teresa de Ahumada lived in Quito. For this reason, to differentiate her from her aunt, she was sometimes called "Teresa la Quiteña".

Lorenzo, Teresa de Ahumada's father, had arrived in Peru with the Vaca de Castro expedition in 1540. Nine years later, he would arrive at the Real Audiencia of Quito, and on 1 January 1550, Lorenzo was named councilor of the town council and also treasurer of the Royal Treasury. As an official, he held the positions of lieutenant governor and captain-general. He also served as ordinary mayor of the city.

Lorenzo and Juana were married on May 18, 1556. Juana was born in Trujillo, Perú. Juana's parents were Francisco Antonio de Fuentes y Guzmán and Bárbola Espinosa. Juana's mother was born of an illegitimate union of Licenciado Gaspar de Espinosa, judge of Santo Domingo and first governor of Panama, with an indigenous woman. Juana, however, was part of the high society of Lima and married at the age of 18.

During his stay in Quito, Lorenzo was Judge of Residence of Adelantado Juan de Salinas and Fiscal Visitor of Loja, Cuenca and Zamora. He also formed part of the High Court of these three cities. It is important to remember that within his functions, in 1565, he prohibited the servitude of the indigenous people. He was also successful in his business, which helped the foundations that Teresa de Jesús made in Ávila. As for his brothers, he had six in total, of whom three died young. His brother Pedro maintained very close contact with the Convent of San José in Ávila and continually sent financial help to build the convent started by their sister, Teresa de Jesus.

In 1575, Lorenzo decided to return to Spain with his four surviving children and his two brothers. Unfortunately, Teresa de Ahumada's uncle, Jerónimo, died during the trip, as did Esteban, one of Teresa de Ahumada's brothers. They finally arrived in Seville in mid-August 1575, and were welcomed by Teresa de Jesus.

Consequently, Teresa de Ahumada was admitted to "Carmelo", the Carmelite convent of Seville, and began to wear the Carmelite habit. Before leaving Seville, she was portrayed on a canvas by Juan de la Miseria, who had also portrayed Teresa de Jesus. In the portrait, he painted Teresa de Ahumada dressed as a Carmelite with the typical brown habit and a white cape of 10 years of age. She would continue to wear the habit until she began the novitiate in 1581 in Convento de San José in Ávila. However, a year before beginning the novitiate, on June 26, 1580, she would lose her father and would be left completely orphaned. Her brother would marry and the mother-in-law would try to divert Teresa de Ahumada's inheritance in favor of her brother. This affected Teresa de Ahumada and caused her to begin her vocational crisis.

Teresa de Ahumada continued her close relationship with Teresa de Jesus and accompanied her aunt on a trip to Burgos to participate in the founding of its Carmelite convent, Convento de Carmelitas Descalzos (Burgos). For this reason, Teresa de Ahumada was able to attend the communion of Teresa de Jesus when she was nearing her final days on October 3. On 5 November 1582, Teresa de Ahumada gave her vows and was received by Anne of Saint Bartholomew. Teresa de Ahumada would remain in the Convento de San José in Ávila for the rest of her life and would always seek to support the process of beatification for her aunt, Teresa of Jesus. Teresa de Ahumada testified on her aunt's behalf twice on 22 January 1596 and 9 September 1610; the second time was on the eve of Teresa de Ahumada's death at the age of forty-four.

== Writings ==
Teresa de Ahumada learned to read and write from a young age, her family taking a great interest in the child's education. Teresa de Jesus stated that Teresa de Ahumada had beautiful handwriting. This can be seen in the books she wrote:

- Libro de su Vida (Book of her Life)
- Relaciones espirituales de Santa Teresa según el Códice de Salamanca (Spiritual relationships of Teresa according to the Codex of Salamanca)
- Virtudes de nuestra Madre Teresa según la relación de su prima la Venerable Madre María de San Jerónimo (Virtues of our Mother Teresa according to the account of her cousin the Venerable Mother Maria de San Jerónimo)
- Narración del recibimiento que hizo la ciudad de Ávila a D. Álvaro de Mendoz (Narrative of the reception that the city of Ávila gave to D. Álvaro de Mendoza)
- Últimas acciones de la vida de Santa Teresa por la Venerable Ana de San Bartolom (Last actions of the life of Teresa by Ana de San Bartolomé)

There are three preserved letters from Teresa de Ahumada. The first was addressed to Mother Leonor de San Bernardo in 1608. The second was addressed to Mother Ana de San Bartolomé on 24 May 1610. Finally, the third is kept in the Carmelite convent of Santa Ana in Madrid. It is also known that in addition to her mastery of language, she knew arithmetic and some phrases in Quechua language that she learned in Peru.

== Spiritual life ==
Teresa de Ahumada followed in the footsteps of her aunt, and the entire family supported her. She made her profession in October 1582, in the convent of San José de Ávila with the help of the Most Reverend Father Fray Juan Bautista Cafardo. To do so, she contributed with a 40,000-and-800-maravedí annuity.

From her convent life, there are records of her daily practices, among which the prayer of the Rosary stands out, something she had learned when she was very young. She also confessed that communion freed her from the paralysis of the tongue that occasionally affected her. This was due to a paralysis that caused difficulties when speaking. However, this improved a lot after receiving communion.

== Later life ==
The last days of her life were dedicated to promoting the canonization of her aunt. To do this, Teresa de Ahumada would make an extensive declaration where she showed her fervor for Teresa de Jesus. This most likely happened inside her cell, days before Teresa de Ahumada died. This would have happened on Friday, 10 September 1610 when she was 44 years old. At the moment, the exact place where she is buried is unknown, although it is known indirectly that she was buried in the Chapter House. In that convent, there is also an image of the Child Jesus, which is called Mayorazgo, because it was the first to undergo the Reform. This image also comes from South America. In addition, there are several ceramics from the cell that had their origin in Peru. Additionally, there is a sculpture of El Quitito, a name that already reveals its prominence since Teresa de Ahumada took it to Carmelo in 1575 when she arrived from Quito. Her legacy lies in being the first American to follow in the footsteps of the reformed Carmelites.
