= Daniel Ahumada =

Chilean footballer (born 1960)

Personal information
- Full name: Daniel Ahumada Gaete
- Date of birth: 2 February 1960 (age 66)
- Position: Defender

Senior career*
Years	Team	Apps	(Gls)
- Unión La Calera
1992	Deportes Temuco		
- * Club domestic league appearances and goals

Daniel Ahumada Gaete (born 2 February 1960) is a Chilean former footballer.
