= Teresa of Ávila =

Spanish Carmelite mystic and saint (1515–1582)

Saint Teresa of Ávila OCD
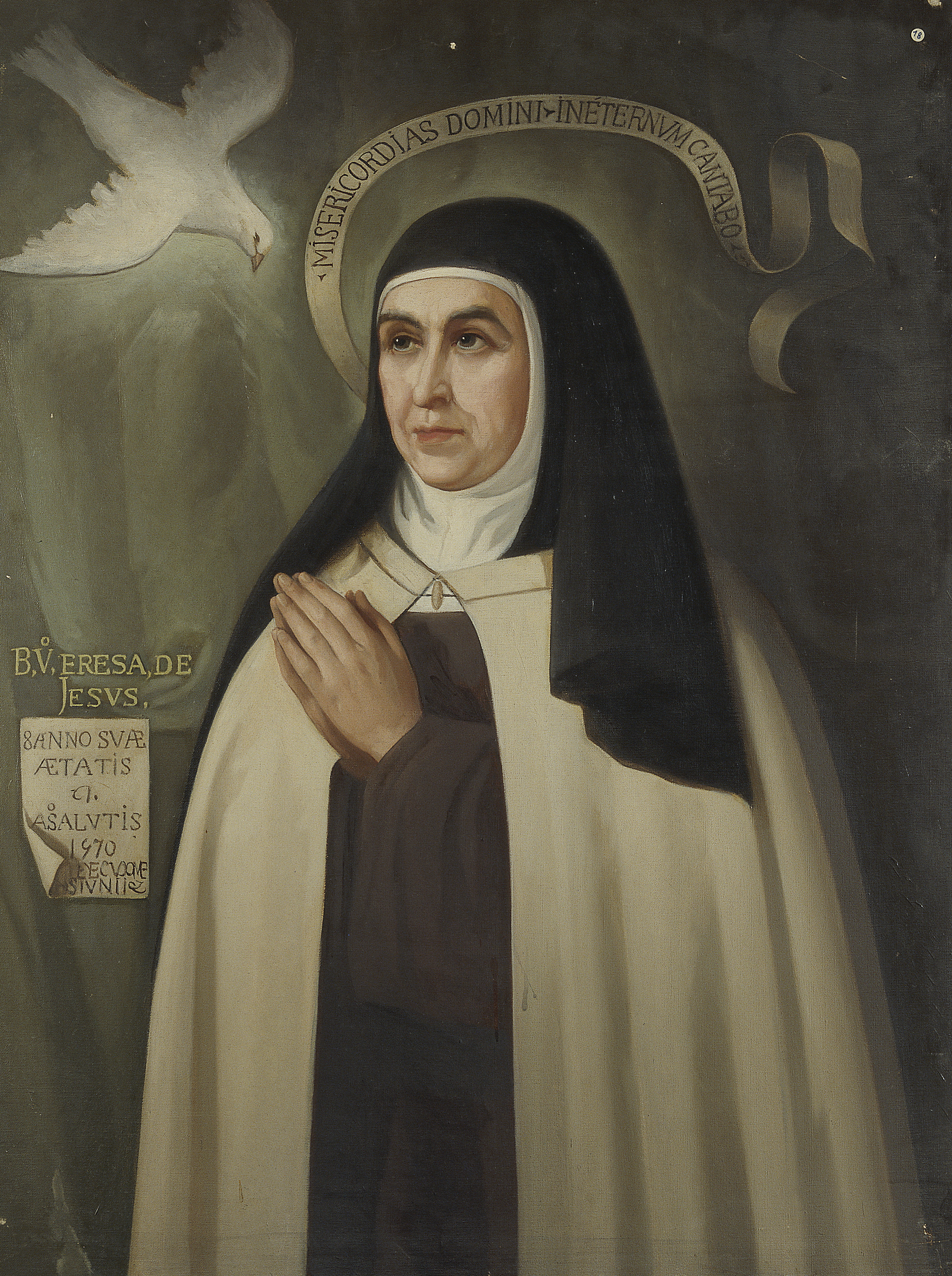
- Saint Teresa of Ávila by Eduardo Balaca

Virgin, Doctor of the Church
- Born: Teresa Sánchez de Cepeda Dávila y Ahumada; 28 March 1515; Ávila or Gotarrendura, Crown of Castile
- Died: 4 October 1582 (aged 67) (Note: At some hour of the night between 4 October and 15 October 1582, the night of the transition in Spain from the Julian to the Gregorian calendar.); Alba de Tormes, Crown of Castile
- Venerated in: Roman Catholic Church; Anglican Communion; Lutheranism
- Beatified: 24 April 1614, Rome by Pope Paul V
- Canonized: 12 March 1622, Rome by Pope Gregory XV
- Major shrine: Convent of the Annunciation, Alba de Tormes, Spain
- Feast: 15 October
- Attributes: Carmelite religious habit, biretta, quill, dove (as an attribute of the Holy Spirit), heart with a christogram
- Patronage: Spain, sick people, people in religious orders, chess, people ridiculed for their piety, lacemakers; Požega, Croatia; Talisay, Cebu, Malalag, Davao del Sur, Carles, Iloilo, Philippines
- Controversy: Her reforms met with determined opposition and interest from the Spanish Inquisition, but no charges were laid against her. Her order split as a result.
- Theology career
- Notable work: Camino de Perfección; El Castillo Interior
- Theological work
- Era: Counter-Reformation
- Tradition or movement: Christian mysticism
- Main interests: Theology
- Notable ideas: Mental prayer, Prayer of quiet

Teresa of Ávila (Note: Pronounced /ˈɑːvɪlə/) (born Teresa Sánchez de Cepeda Dávila y Ahumada; (Note: Spanish pronunciation: [teˈɾesa ˈsantʃeθ de θeˈpeða ˈdaβila i a.uˈmaða]) 28 March 1515 – 4 or 15 October 1582), religious name Teresa of Jesus, was a Carmelite nun, prominent Spanish mystic and spiritual reformer.

Active during the Counter-Reformation, Teresa became the central figure of a movement of spiritual and monastic renewal, reforming the Carmelite orders of both women and men. The movement was later joined by the younger Carmelite friar and mystic Saint John of the Cross, with whom she established the Discalced Carmelites. A formal papal decree adopting the split from the old order was issued in 1580.

Teresa's autobiography, The Life of Teresa of Jesus, and her books The Interior Castle and The Way of Perfection are prominent works on Christian mysticism and Christian meditation practice. In her autobiography, written as a defense of her ecstatic mystical experiences, she discerns four stages in the ascent of the soul to God: mental prayer and meditation; the prayer of quiet; absorption-in-God; ecstatic consciousness. The Interior Castle, written as a spiritual guide for her Carmelite sisters, uses the illustration of seven mansions within the castle of the soul to describe the different states one's soul can be in during life.

Forty years after her death, in 1622, Teresa was canonized by Pope Gregory XV. On 27 September 1970 Pope Paul VI proclaimed Teresa the first female Doctor of the Church in recognition of her centuries-long spiritual legacy to the Catholic Church.

== Biography ==
=== Early life ===
Teresa Sánchez de Cepeda Dávila y Ahumada was born on 28 March 1515. Her birthplace was either Ávila or Gotarrendura. Her paternal grandfather, Juan Sánchez de Toledo, was a marrano or converso, a Jew forced to convert to Christianity or emigrate. When Teresa's father was a child, Juan was condemned by the Spanish Inquisition for allegedly returning to Judaism, but he was later able to assume a Catholic identity. Her father, Alonso Sánchez de Cepeda, was a successful wool merchant and one of the wealthiest men in Ávila. He bought a knighthood and assimilated successfully into Christian society.

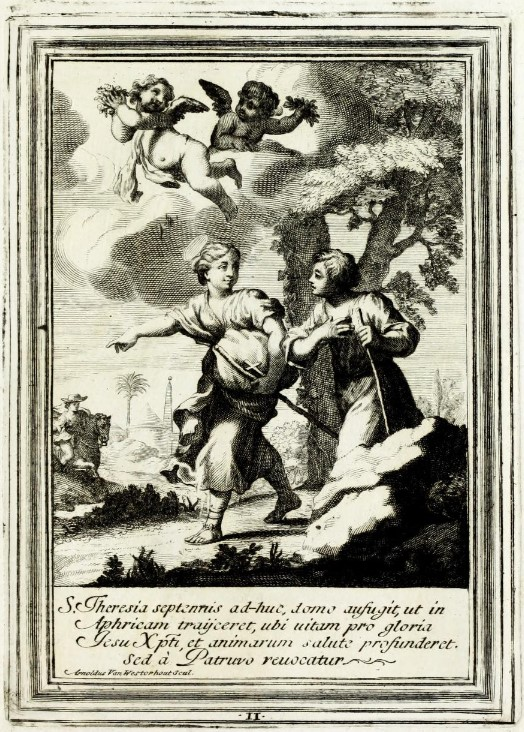
Young Teresa of Ávila and brother run away from home to travel to Africa by Arnold van Westerhout

Sánchez de Cepeda was previously married to Catalina del Peso y Henao, with whom he had three children. In 1509, he married Teresa's mother, Beatriz de Ahumada y Cuevas, in Gotarrendura. Her brother, Lorenzo de Cepeda y Ahumada, was the father of Teresa de Ahumada.

Teresa's mother raised her as a dedicated Christian. Fascinated by accounts of the lives of the saints, she ran away from home at age seven with her brother Rodrigo to seek martyrdom in the fight against the Moors. Her uncle brought them home when he spotted them just outside the town walls.

When Teresa was fourteen years old, her mother died, leaving her grief-stricken. This prompted her to embrace a deeper devotion to the Virgin Mary as her spiritual mother. Teresa was also enamored with popular fiction, which at the time consisted primarily of medieval tales of knighthood and works about fashion, gardens and flowers. Teresa was sent to the Augustinian nuns' school in Ávila.

=== Religious life ===
==== Ascetic and mystical practice ====
After completing her education, she initially resisted the idea of a religious vocation, but she eventually relented after a stay with her uncle and other relatives. In 1534, aged 20, much to the disappointment of her pious and austere father, she decided to enter the local, easy-going Carmelite Convent of the Incarnation, built on land that had previously been used as a burial ground for Jews. She took up religious reading on contemplative prayer, including Osuna's Abecedario espiritual ("Third Spiritual Alphabet", 1527), a guide on the examination of conscience and "spiritual self-concentration and inner contemplation, known in mystical nomenclature as oratio recollectionis". She also dipped into other mystical ascetical works such as the Tractatus de oratione et meditatione of Peter of Alcantara.

Her zeal for mortification caused her to become ill and she spent almost a year in bed, causing huge worry to her community and family. She nearly died but she recovered, attributing her recovery to the miraculous intercession of Saint Joseph. She began to experience bouts of religious ecstasy. She reported that, during her illness, she had progressed from the lowest stage of "recollection", to the "devotions of silence" and finally to the "devotions of ecstasy", during which she achieved "perfect union with God" and experienced the "blessing of tears" (see § Mysticism). As the Catholic distinction between mortal and venial sin became clear to her, she came to understand the awful horror of sin and the inherent nature of original sin.

Around the same time, she received a copy of the full Spanish translation of Augustine of Hippo's autobiographical work Confessions, which eased her scrupulosity. She found solace in the knowledge that such a great saint was once an inveterate sinner. In her autobiography, she wrote that she "was very fond of St. Augustine [...] for he was a sinner too".

==== Transverberation ====
Around 1556, friends suggested that her newfound knowledge could be of diabolical rather than divine origin. She had begun to inflict mortifications of the flesh upon herself. But her confessor, the Jesuit Francis Borgia, reassured her of the divine inspiration of her thoughts. On St. Peter's Day in 1559, Teresa became firmly convinced that Jesus Christ had presented himself to her in bodily form, though invisible. These visions lasted almost uninterruptedly for more than two years. In another vision, the famous transverberation, a seraph drove the fiery point of a golden lance repeatedly through her heart, causing her an ineffable spiritual and bodily pain:

I saw in his hand a long spear of gold, and at the point there seemed to be a little fire. He appeared to me to be thrusting it at times into my heart, and to pierce my very entrails; when he drew it out, he seemed to draw them out also, and to leave me all on fire with a great love of God. The pain was so great, that it made me moan; and yet so surpassing was the sweetness of this excessive pain, that I could not wish to be rid of it ... (Note: Teresa wrote that it must be a cherub (Deben ser los que llaman cherubines), but Fr. Domingo Báñez wrote in the margin that it seemed more like a seraph (mas parece de los que se llaman seraphis), an identification that most editors have followed. Santa Teresa de Ávila. "Libro de su vida". Escritos de Santa Teresa.)

The account of this vision was the inspiration for one of Bernini's most famous works, the Ecstasy of Saint Teresa at Santa Maria della Vittoria in Rome. Although based in part on Teresa's description of her mystical transverberation in her autobiography, Bernini's depiction of the event is considered by some to be highly eroticized, especially when compared to the entire preceding artistic Teresian tradition. (Note: For the creation of the work and an analysis of its transgression of religious decorum, see Franco Mormando's article, "Did Bernini's 'Ecstasy of St. Teresa' Cross a 17th-century Line of Decorum?," Word and Image, 39:4, 2023: 351–83 doi:10.1080/02666286.2023.2180931.)

The memory of this episode served as an inspiration throughout the rest of her life, and motivated her lifelong imitation of the life and suffering of Jesus, epitomized in the adage often associated with her: "Lord, either let me suffer or let me die."

Teresa, who became a celebrity in her town for dispensing wisdom from behind the convent grille, was known for her raptures, which sometimes involved levitation. It was a source of embarrassment to her and she bade her sisters hold her down when this occurred. Subsequently, historians, neurologists, and psychiatrists like Peter Fenwick and Javier Álvarez-Rodríguez, among others, have taken an interest in her symptomatology. The fact that she wrote down virtually everything that happened to her during her religious life means that an invaluable and exceedingly rare medical record from the 16th century has been preserved. Examination of this record has led to the speculative conclusion that she may have suffered from temporal lobe epilepsy.

==== Monastic reformer ====
Over time, Teresa found herself increasingly at odds with the spiritual malaise prevailing in her convent of the Incarnation. Among the 150 nuns living there, the observance of the enclosure, designed to protect and strengthen spiritual practice and prayer, became so lax that it appeared to lose its purpose. The daily invasion of visitors, many of high social and political rank, disturbed the atmosphere with frivolous concerns and vacuous conversation. Such intrusions in the solitude essential to develop and sustain contemplative prayer so grieved Teresa that she longed to intervene.

The incentive to take the practical steps inspired by her inward motivation was supported by the Franciscan priest, Peter of Alcantara, who met her early in 1560 and became her spiritual adviser. She resolved to found a "reformed" Carmelite convent, correcting the laxity which she had found at the Incarnation convent and elsewhere besides. Doña Guiomar of Ulloa, a friend, was granted permission for the project.

The abject poverty of the new convent, established in 1562 and named St. Joseph's (San José), at first caused a scandal among the citizens and authorities of Ávila, and the small house with its chapel was in peril of suppression. However, powerful patrons, including the local bishop, coupled with the impression of well ordered subsistence and purpose, turned animosity into approval.

In March 1563, after Teresa had moved to the new convent house, she received papal sanction for her primary principles of absolute poverty and renunciation of ownership of property, which she proceeded to formulate into a "constitution". Her plan was the revival of the earlier, stricter monastic rules, supplemented by new regulations including the three disciplines of ceremonial flagellation prescribed for the Divine Office every week, and the discalceation of the religious. For the first five years, Teresa remained in seclusion, mostly engaged in prayer and writing.

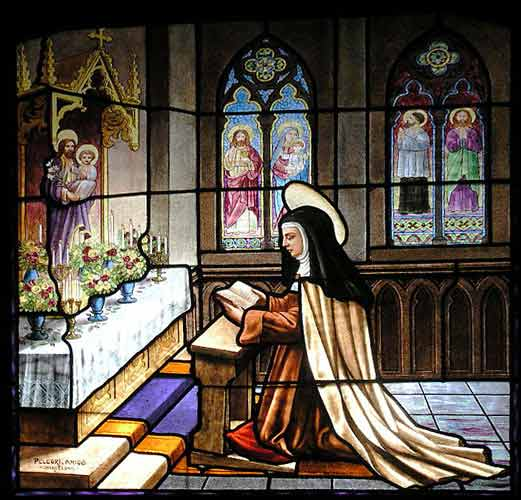
Church window at the Convent of St Teresa

==== Extended travels ====
In 1567, Teresa received a patent from the Carmelite General, Rubeo de Ravenna, to establish further houses of the new order. This process required many visitations and long journeys across nearly all the provinces of Spain. She left a record of the arduous project in her Libro de las Fundaciones. Between 1567 and 1571, reformed convents were established at Medina del Campo, Malagón, Valladolid, Toledo, Pastrana, Salamanca, and Alba de Tormes.

As part of the original patent, Teresa was given permission to set up two houses for men who wished to adopt the reforms. She convinced two Carmelite friars, John of the Cross and Anthony of Jesus to help with this. They founded the first monastery of Discalced Carmelite brothers in November 1568 at Duruelo. Another friend of Teresa, Jerónimo Gracián, the Carmelite visitator of the older observance of Andalusia and apostolic commissioner, and later provincial of the Teresian order, gave her powerful support in founding monasteries at Segovia (1571), Beas de Segura (1574), Seville (1575), and Caravaca de la Cruz (Murcia, 1576). Meanwhile, John of the Cross promoted the inner life of the movement through his power as a teacher and preacher.

==== Opposition to reforms ====
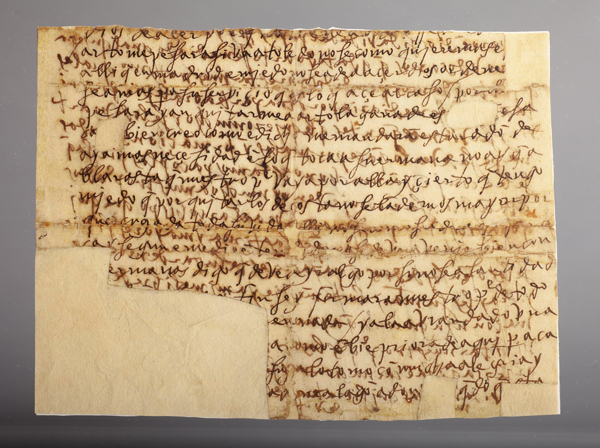
Letter from Teresa of Ávila to her niece, Madre María Bautista (1575)

In 1576, members of the Carmelite order of the Ancient observance began to persecute Teresa, her supporters and her reforms. Following a number of resolutions adopted at the general chapter at Piacenza, the governing body of the order forbade all further founding of reformed convents. The general chapter instructed her to go into "voluntary" retirement at one of her institutions. She obeyed and chose St. Joseph's at Toledo. Meanwhile, her friends and associates were subjected to further attacks.

Several years later, her appeals by letter to King Philip II of Spain secured relief. As a result, in 1579, the cases before the inquisition against her, Gracián and others, were dropped. This allowed the reform to resume. An edict from Pope Gregory XIII allowed the appointment of a special provincial for the newer branch of the Carmelite religious, and a royal decree created a "protective" board of four assessors for the reform.

During the last three years of her life, Teresa founded convents at Villanueva de la Jara in northern Andalusia (1580), Palencia (1580), Soria (1581), Burgos, and Granada (1582). In total, seventeen convents, all but one founded by her, and as many men's monasteries, were owed to her reforms over twenty years.

=== Last days ===
Her final illness overtook her on one of her journeys from Burgos to Alba de Tormes. She died in 1582, just as Catholic Europe was making the switch from the Julian to the Gregorian calendar, which required the excision of the dates of 5–14 October from the calendar. Teresa died either before midnight of 4 October or early in the morning of 15 October, which is celebrated as her feast day. Her last words were, "My Lord, it is time to move on. Well then, may your will be done. O my Lord and my Spouse, the hour that I have longed for has come. It is time to meet one another."

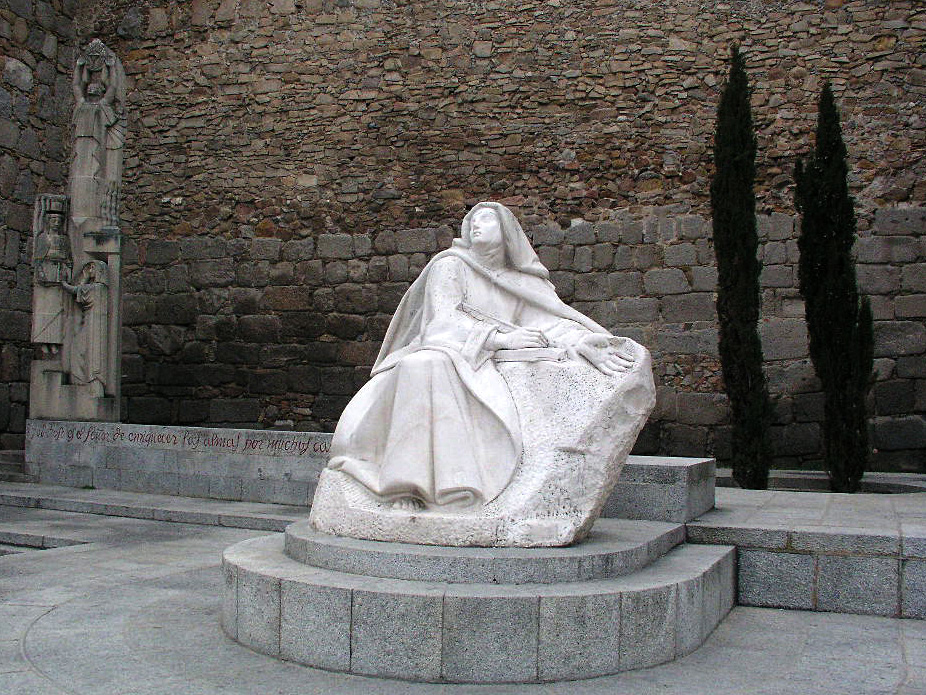
Avila, Saint Theresa's statue

=== After death ===
==== Holy relics ====
She was buried at the Convento de la Anunciación in Alba de Tormes. Nine months after her death the coffin was opened and her body was found to be intact but the clothing had rotted. Before the body was re-interred one of her hands was cut off, wrapped in a scarf and sent to Ávila. Gracián cut the little finger off the hand and – according to his own account – kept it with him until he was captured by Barbary corsairs when sailing from Messina to Rome, from whom he had to redeem it with a few rings and 20 reales. The body was exhumed again on 25 November 1585 to be moved to Ávila and found to be incorrupt. An arm was removed and left in Alba de Tormes at the nuns' request, to compensate for losing the main relic of Teresa, but the rest of the body was reburied in the Discalced Carmelite chapter house in Ávila. The removal was done without the approval of the Duke of Alba de Tormes and he brought the body back in 1586, with Pope Sixtus V ordering that it remain in Alba de Tormes on pain of excommunication. A grander tomb on the original site was raised in 1598 and the body was moved to a new chapel in 1616.

The body still remains there, except for the following parts:

- Rome – right foot and part of the upper jaw
- Lisbon – hand
- Ronda, Spain – left eye and left hand (the latter was kept by Francisco Franco until his death, after Francoist troops captured it from Republican troops during the Spanish Civil War)
- Museum of the Church of the Annunciation, Alba de Tormes – left arm and heart
- Church of Our Lady of Loreto, Paris, France – one finger
- Sanlúcar de Barrameda – one finger

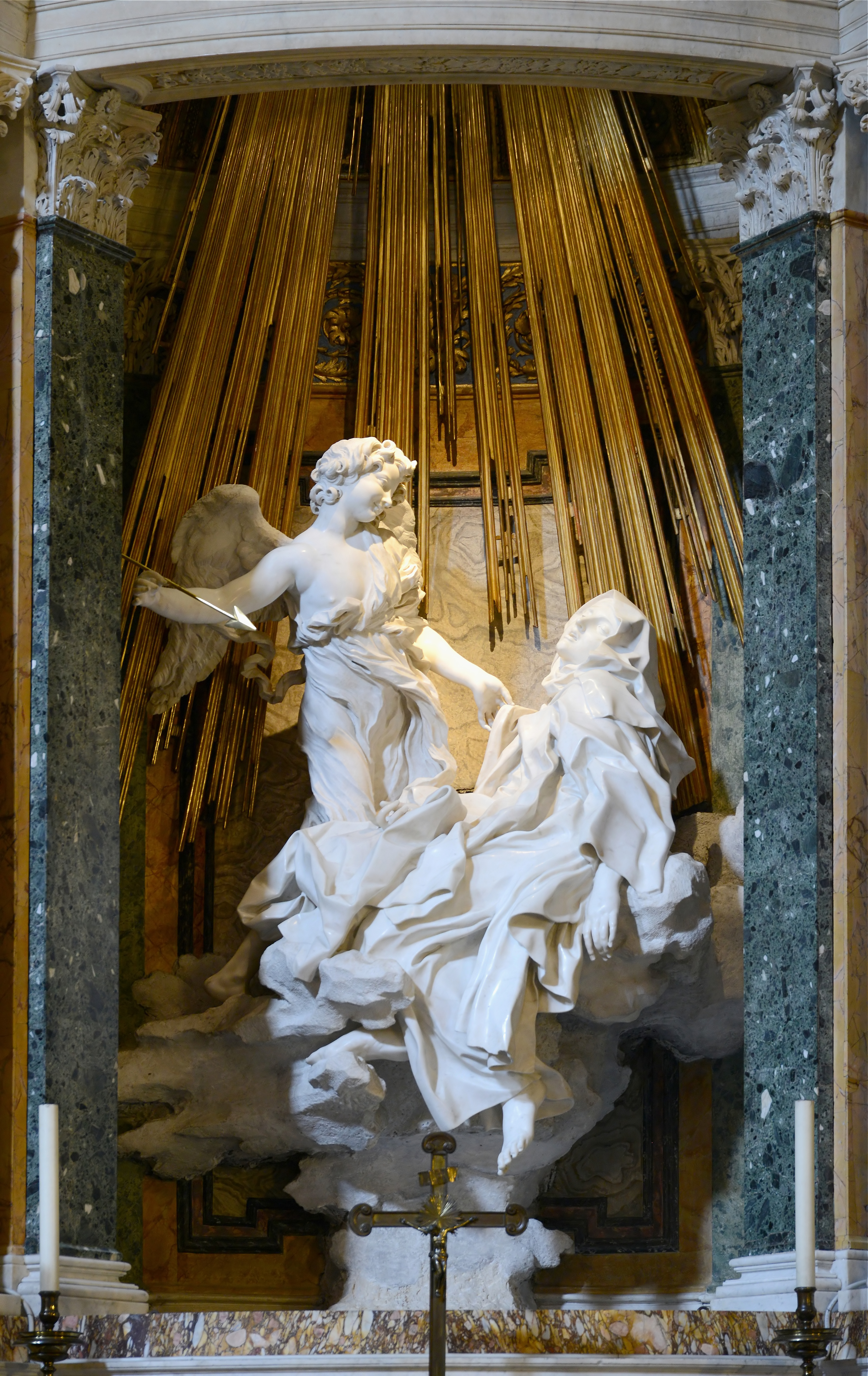
The Ecstasy of Saint Teresa by Bernini, Basilica of Santa Maria della Vittoria, Rome

On August 28, 2024, it was made the canonical recognition of Teresa's relics. The postulator general of the Order of Discalced Carmelites, Marco Chiesa, announced that those present at the scene were able to see that "it is in the same condition as when it was last opened in 1914."

When the body was publicly exposed in May 2025, netizens questioned the incorrupted state of the corpse, given its apparent condition.

==== Veneration ====
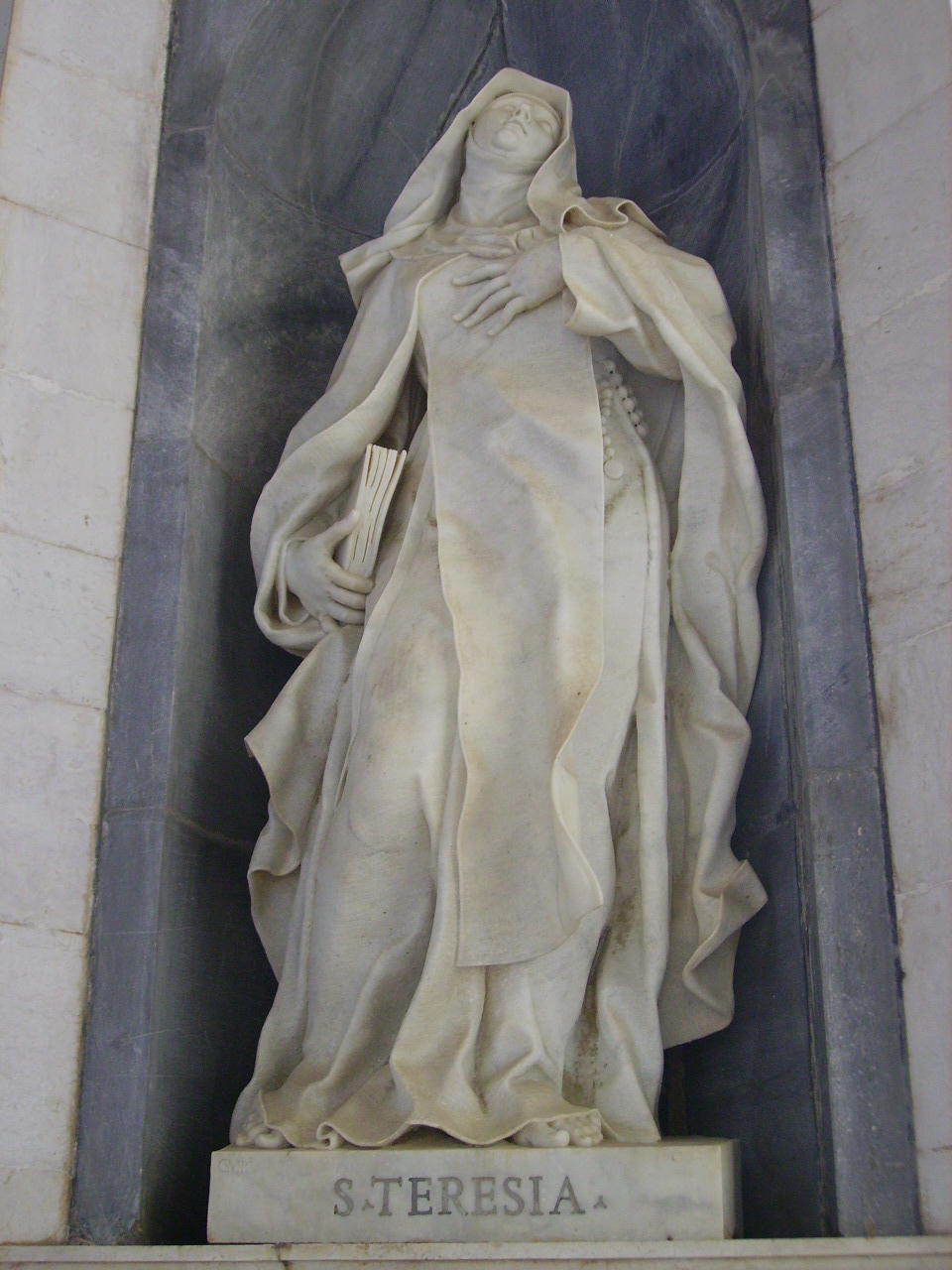
Statue of Saint Teresa of Ávila in Mafra National Palace, Mafra

In 1622, forty years after her death, Teresa was canonized by Pope Gregory XV. The Cortes exalted her to patron saint of Spain in 1627. The University of Salamanca had granted her the title Doctor ecclesiae ("Doctor of the Church") with a diploma in her lifetime, but that title is distinct from the papal honour of Doctor of the Church, which is always conferred posthumously. The latter was finally bestowed upon Teresa by Pope Paul VI on 27 September 1970, along with Catherine of Siena, making them the first women to be awarded the distinction. Teresa is revered as Doctor orationis ("Doctor of Prayer"). The mysticism in her works exerted a formative influence upon many theologians of the following centuries, such as Francis of Sales, Fénelon, and the Port-Royalists. In 1670, Teresa's coffin was plated in silver.

Teresa of Avila is honored in the Church of England and in the Episcopal Church on 15 October.

==== Patron saint ====
In 1626, at the request of Philip IV of Spain, the Castilian parliament (Note: Rowe 2011, p. 47 refers to the Castilian Cortes as the "Castilian parliament") elected Teresa "without lacking one vote" as copatron saint of Castile. This status was affirmed by Pope Urban VIII in a brief issued on 21 July 1627 in which he stated:

For these reasons [the king's and Cortes's elections] and for the great devotion which they have for Teresa, they elected her for patron and advocate of these kingdoms in the last Cortes of the aforementioned kingdoms ... And because ... the representatives in the Cortes desired it so greatly that their vote be firm and perpetual, we grant it our patronage and the approval of the Holy Apostolic See.

— Rowe 2011, pp. 77–78

More broadly, the 1620s, the entirety of Spain (Castile and beyond) debated who should be the country's patron saint; the choices were either the current patron, James Matamoros, or a pairing of him and the newly canonised Saint Teresa of Ávila. Teresa's promoters said Spain faced newer challenges, especially the threat of Protestantism and societal decline at home, thus needing a more contemporary patron who understood those issues and could guide the Spanish nation. Santiago's supporters (Santiaguistas) fought back and eventually won the argument, but Teresa of Ávila remained far more popular at the local level. James the Great kept the title of patron saint for the Spanish people, and the most Blessed Virgin Mary under the title Immaculate Conception as the sole patron for the entire Spanish Kingdom.

==== Legacy regarding the Infant Jesus of Prague ====
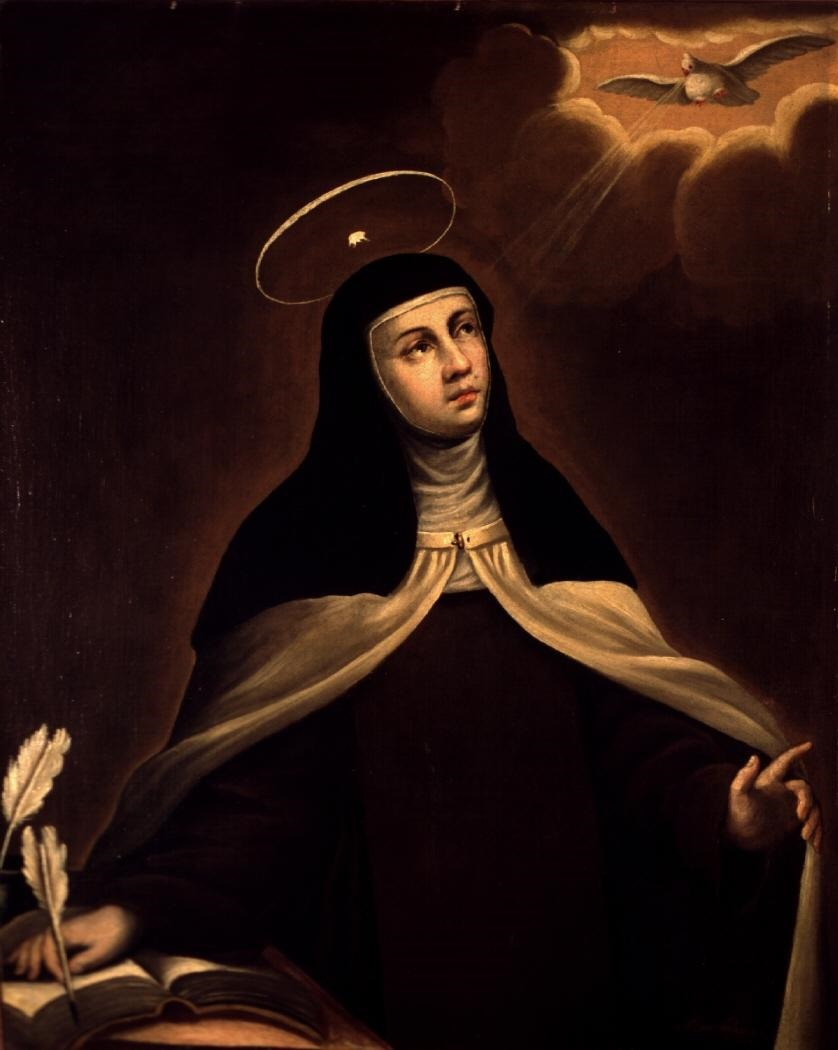
"It is love alone that gives worth to all things."

The Spanish nuns who established Carmel in France brought a devotion to the Infant Jesus with them, and it became widespread in France.

Though there are no written historical accounts establishing that Teresa of Ávila ever owned the famous Infant Jesus of Prague statue, according to tradition, such a statue is said to have been in her possession and Teresa is reputed to have given it to a noblewoman travelling to Prague. The age of the statue dates to approximately the same time as Teresa. It has been thought that Teresa carried a portable statue of the Child Jesus wherever she went; the idea circulated by the early 1700s.

== Writings ==
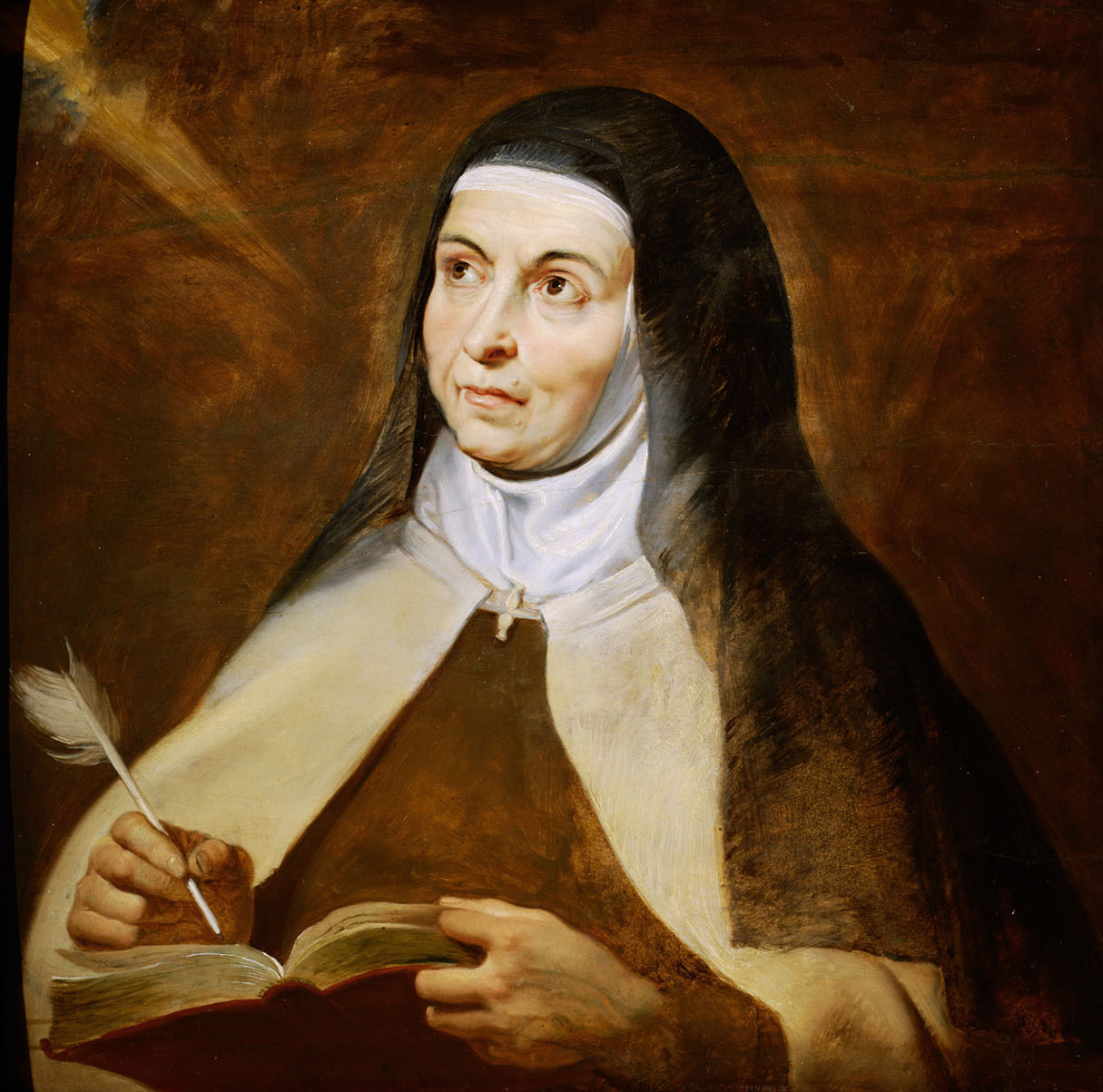
Teresa of Ávila, by Rubens. This is the portrait of Teresa that is probably the most true to her appearance. It is a copy of an original 1576 painting of her when she was 61.

=== Autobiography ===
The autobiography La Vida de la Santa Madre Teresa de Jesús (The Life of the Holy Mother Teresa of Jesus) was written at Ávila between 1562 and 1565, but published posthumously. Editions include:

- The Life of St. Teresa of Jesus ... Written by herself. Translated from the Spanish by D. Lewis, 1870. London: Burns, Oates, & Co
- The Autobiography, written before 1567, under the direction of her confessor, Fr. Pedro Ibáñez, 1882
- The Life of Saint Teresa of Avila by herself. J. M. Cohen, 1957. Penguin Classics
- Life of St. Teresa of Jesus. Translated by Benedict Zimmerman, 1997. Tan Books, ISBN 978-0-89555-603-5
- The Life of Teresa of Jesus: The Autobiography of Teresa of Avila. Translated by E. Allison Peers, 1991. Doubleday, ISBN 978-0-385-01109-9
- The Book of Her Life, translated, with notes, by Kieran Kavanaugh, OCD and Otilio Rodriguez, OCD, 2008. Introduction by Jodi Bilinkoff. Indianapolis/Cambridge: Hackett Publishing Company, ISBN 978-0-87220-907-7
- The Book of My Life. Mirabai Starr, 2008. Boston, Massachusetts: Shambhala Publications, ISBN 978-1-59030-573-7

=== The Way of Perfection ===
The Way of Perfection (Spanish: Camino de Perfección) was published in 1566. Teresa called this a "living book" and in it set out to teach her nuns how to progress through prayer and Christian meditation. She discusses the rationale for being a Carmelite, and the rest deals with the purpose of and approaches to spiritual life. The title was inspired by the devotional book The Imitation of Christ (1418) which had become a favourite expression of Teresa much before she wrote this work, as it appeared at several places in her autobiography, The Life of Teresa of Jesus. Like her other books, The Way of Perfection was written on the advice of her counsellors to describe her experiences in prayer during the period when the Reformation was spreading through Europe. Herein she describes ways of attaining spiritual perfection through prayer and its four stages, as in meditation, quiet, repose of soul and finally perfect union with God, which she equates with rapture.

Editions

- El Camino de Perfección (The Way of Perfection), written also before 1567, at the direction of her confessor.
- The Way of Perfection, and Conceptions of Divine Love, translated by J. Dalton, C. Dolman, 1852.
- The Way of Perfection. Translated and Edited by E. Allison Peers, Doubleday, 1991. ISBN 978-0-385-06539-9
- The Way of Perfection, TAN Books, 1997. ISBN 978-0-89555-602-8
- Way of Perfection, London, 2012. limovia.net ISBN 978-1-78336-025-3

=== Interior Castle ===
The Interior Castle, or The Mansions (Spanish: El Castillo Interior or Las Moradas), was written in 1577 and published in 1588. It contained the basis for what she felt should be the ideal journey of faith, comparing the contemplative soul to a castle with seven successive interior courts, or chambers, analogous to the seven mansions. The work was inspired by her vision of the soul as a diamond in the shape of a castle containing seven mansions, which she interpreted as the journey of faith through seven stages, ending with union with God. Fray Diego, one of Teresa's former confessors, wrote that God revealed to Teresa:

... a most beautiful crystal globe, made in the shape of a castle, and containing seven mansions, in the seventh and innermost of which was the King of Glory, in the greatest splendour, illumining and beautifying them all. The nearer one got to the centre, the stronger was the light; outside the palace limits everything was foul, dark and infested with toads, vipers and other venomous creatures."

Christia Mercer, Columbia University philosophy professor, claims that the 17th-century Frenchman René Descartes lifted some of his most influential ideas from Teresa of Ávila, who, 50 years earlier, wrote popular books about the role of philosophical reflection in intellectual growth. She describes a number of striking similarities between Descartes's seminal work Meditations on First Philosophy and Teresa's Interior Castle.

==== Translations ====
- The first English translation was published in 1675.
- Fr. John Dalton (1852). John Dalton’s translation of The Interior Castle contains an interesting preface and translations of other letters by St. Teresa.
- Benedictines of Stanbrook, edited by Fr. Zimmerman (1921). The translation of The Interior Castle by the Benedictines of Stanbrook also has an excellent introduction and includes many cross-references to other works by St. Teresa.
- E. Allison Peers (1946). E. Allison Peers’ translation of The Interior Castle is another popular public domain version translated by a professor and scholar of Hispanic studies.
- Fr. Kieran Kavanaugh (1979). This translation also stays true to the text and contains many useful cross-references. An updated study edition contains comprehensive notes, reflection questions and a glossary.
- The Interior Castle – The Mansions, TAN Books, 1997. ISBN 978-0-89555-604-2
- Mirabai Starr (2004). Described as "free of religious dogma, this modern translation renders St. Teresa's work a beautiful and practical set of teachings for seekers of all faiths in need of spiritual guidance". Starr’s interpretive version of The Interior Castle eliminates Teresa’s use of words such as "sin", which results in a translation which is more paraphrased than accurate translation and departs significantly from the original's meaning.
- The Interior Castle – Modern update of the spiritual guide by Teresa of Avila. by M.B. Anderson, Root Classics (publisher), 2022. ISBN 978-1-956314-01-4. (Note: Learn more about what was modified in the modern update of The Interior Castle.)

==== In popular culture ====
St. Teresa's mystical experiences have inspired several authors in modern times, but not necessarily from Teresa's Christian theological perspective.

- She is mentioned in Elizabeth Goudge's play The Brontës of Haworth (in Three Plays, Duckworth, London, 1939) as one of the authors included by Emily Brontë when she and her sister Charlotte are packing to go to Brussels. In the play, Emily is depicted as very interested in mysticism, and is also packing a book by Saint John of the Cross, and another by John Ruysbroeck (John of Ruusbroec or Jan van Ruusbroec: 1293/94–1381: a medieval mystic from the Low Countries).
- The 2006 book Eat, Pray, Love by Elizabeth Gilbert recognizes St. Teresa as "that most mystical of Catholic figures" and alludes to St. Teresa's Interior Castle as the "mansions of her being" and her journey as one of "divine meditative bliss".
- The 2007 book by American spiritual author Caroline Myss Entering the Castle was inspired by St. Teresa's Interior Castle, but still has a New Age approach to mysticism.
- St. Teresa also inspired American author R. A. Lafferty in his novel Fourth Mansions (1969), which was nominated for the Nebula Award for Best Novel in 1970.
- Brooke Fraser's song "Orphans, Kingdoms" was inspired by St. Teresa's Interior Castle.
- Jean Stafford's short story "The Interior Castle" relates the intense preoccupation of an accident victim with her own brain, which she sees variously as a jewel, a flower, a light in a glass and a set of envelopes within envelopes.
- Jeffrey Eugenides' 2011 novel The Marriage Plot refers to St. Teresa's Interior Castle when recounting the religious experience of Mitchell Grammaticus, one of the main characters of the book.
- Teen Daze's 2012 release The Inner Mansions refers to St. Teresa's Interior Castle in the album's title as well as in the first track. "... have mercy on yourselves! If you realize your pitiable condition, how can you refrain from trying to remove the darkness from the crystal of your souls? Remember, if death should take you now, you would never again enjoy the light of this Sun". This line appears dubbed over the musical introduction to "New Life".
- In Mark Williamson's ONE: a memoir (2018), the metaphor of the Interior Castle is used to describe an inner world of introspective reflection on past events, a set of "memory loci" based on the ancient system of recall for rhetorical purposes.

=== Other ===
- Relaciones (Relationships), an extension of the autobiography giving her inner and outer experiences in epistolary form.
- Her rare poems (Todas las poesías, Munster, 1854) are distinguished for tenderness of feeling and rhythm of thought.
- The Complete Poetry of St. Teresa of Avila. A Bilingual Edition – Edición y traducción de Eric W. Vogt. New Orleans University Press of the South, 1996. Second edition, 2015. xl, 116 p. ISBN 978-1-937030-52-0
- "Meditations on Song of Songs", 1567, written nominally for her daughters at the convent of Our Lady of Mount Carmel.
- Conceptos del Amor ("Concepts of Love") and
- Exclamaciones.
- Las Cartas (Saragossa, 1671), or her correspondence, of which there are 342 extant letters and 87 fragments of others. The first edition of Teresa's letters was published in 1658 with the comment of Juan de Palafox y Mendoza, Roman Catholic bishop of Osma and an opponent to the Company of Jesus.
- The Complete Works of St Teresa of Jesus, in five volumes, translated and edited by E. Allison Peers, including 2 volumes of correspondence. London: Sheed and Ward, 1982.

== Mysticism ==
The prayer Nada te turbe (Let nothing disturb you) is attributed to Teresa, having been found within her breviary:

Let nothing disturb you.
Let nothing make you afraid.
All things are passing.
God alone never changes.
Patience gains all things.
If you have God you will want for nothing.
God alone suffices.

— Teresa of Ávila

The ultimate preoccupation of Teresa's mystical thought, as consistently reflected in her writings, is the ascent of the soul to God. Aumann notes that "the grades of prayer described in The Life do not correspond to the division of prayer commonly given in the manuals of the spiritual", including due to the fact that "St. Teresa did not write a systematic theology of prayer". According to Zimmerman, "In all her writings on this subject she deals with her personal experiences [...] there is no vestige in her writings of any influence of the Areopagite, the Patristic, or the Scholastic Mystical schools, as represented among others, by the German Dominican Mystics. She is intensely personal, her system going exactly as far as her experiences, but not a step further."

Teresa describes in the Interior Castle that the treasure of heaven lies buried within our hearts, and that there is an interior part of the heart which is the centre of the soul.

=== Four stages as described in the autobiography ===
In her autobiography she describes four stages, in which she uses the image of watering one's garden as a metaphor for mystical prayer: (Note: See: The Autobiography Chs. 10–22)

- The first, Devotion of the Heart, consists of mental prayer and meditation. It means the withdrawal of the soul from without, penitence and especially the devout meditation on the passion of Christ (Autobiography 11.20).
- The second, Devotion of Peace, is where human will is surrendered to God. This occurs by virtue of an uplifted awareness granted by God, while other faculties, such as memory, reason, and imagination, are not yet safe from worldly distraction. Although a partial distraction can happen, due to outer activity such as repetition of prayers or writing down spiritual things, the prevailing state is one of quietude (Autobiography 14.1).
- The third, Devotion of Union, concerns the absorption-in-God. It is not only a heightened, but essentially, an ecstatic state. At this level, reason is also surrendered to God, and only the memory and imagination are left to ramble. This state is characterized by a blissful peace, a sweet slumber of at least the higher soul faculties, that is a consciousness of being enraptured by the love of God.
- The fourth, Devotion of Ecstasy, is where the consciousness of being in the body disappears. Sensory faculties cease to operate. Memory and imagination also become absorbed in God, as though intoxicated. Body and spirit dwell in the throes of exquisite pain, alternating between a fearful fiery glow, in complete unconscious helplessness, and periods of apparent strangulation. Sometimes such ecstatic transports literally cause the body to be lifted into space. This state may last as long as half an hour and tends to be followed by relaxation of a few hours of swoon-like weakness, attended by the absence of all faculties while in union with God. The subject awakens from this trance state in tears. It may be regarded as the culmination of mystical experience. Indeed, Teresa was said to have been observed levitating during Mass on more than one occasion.

=== The seven mansions of the Interior castle ===
The Interior Castle is divided into seven mansions (also called dwelling places), each level describing a step to get closer to God. In her work, Teresa already assumed entrance into the first mansions by prayer and meditation.

The purgative stage, involving active prayer and asceticism: (Note: Catholic Strength, The Seven Mansions)

- The first mansion begins with a soul's state of grace, but the souls are surrounded by sin and only starting to seek God's grace through humility in order to achieve perfection.
- The second mansions are also called the Mansion of the Practice of Prayer because the soul seeks to advance through the castle by daily thoughts of God, humble recognition of God's work in the soul and ultimately daily prayer.
- The third mansions are the Mansions of Exemplary Life characterized through divine grace and a love for God that is so great that the soul has an aversion to both mortal and venial sin and a desire to do works of charitable service to man for the ultimate glory of God. The prayer of acquired recollection belongs to the third mansion.

The illuminative stage, the beginning of mystical or contemplative or supernatural prayer:

- The fourth mansions are a departure from the soul actively acquiring what it gains as God increases his role. In this mansion, the soul begins to experience two types of supernatural prayer, namely the Prayer of Supernatural (or passive) Recollection and The Prayer of Quiet;
- The fifth mansion is The Prayer of Union, in which the soul prepares itself to receive gifts from God;

Unitive stage:

- The sixth mansion is the betrothal (engagement) of the soul with God can be compared to lovers. The soul spends increasing amounts of time torn between favors from God and from outside afflictions.
- The seventh mansion is the spiritual marriage with God, in which the soul achieves clarity in prayer

=== Nine grades of prayer ===
==== Overview ====
The first four grades of Teresa's classifications of prayer belong to the ascetical stage of spiritual life. These are vocal prayer, meditational or mental prayer, affective prayer, and acquired or natural recollection. (Note: St. Teresa's Nine Grades of Prayer)

According to Augustin Poulain and Robert Thouless, Teresa described four degrees or stages of mystical union, namely the prayer of quiet, full or semi-ecstatic union, ecstatic union or ecstasy, and transforming or deifying union, or spiritual marriage (properly) of the soul with God. While Augustin Poulain and Robert Thouless do not mention the Prayer of Supernatural (or passive) Recollection as a separate stage, Aumann discerns infused contemplation as a separate stage in the fourth mansion of the Interior Castle. Together, these "five grades are infused prayer and belong to the mystical phase of spiritual life".

Thomas Merton disagrees on a fine-cut distinction between acquired contemplation and the prayer of quiet, noticing the Carmelite tendency of systematization, whereas Teresa herself was just describing her personal experiences. Commenting on Teresa's writings and the scholarly discussions on the precise stages, Thomas Merton comments: "with all these divisions and distinctions, comings and goings and varieties of terms, one tends to become impatient with the saint".

Aumann synthesizes Teresa's writings into nine grades of prayer:

| Threefold classification | The Life | Interior Castle | Nine grades |
| Ascetic | Devotion of the Heart | First mansions | 1. vocal prayer |
| Ascetic | Devotion of the Heart | First mansions | 2. mental prayer or prayer of meditation |
| Ascetic | Devotion of the Heart | First mansions | 3. affective prayer |
| Ascetic | Devotion of the Heart | Second and third mansions | 4. prayer of simplicity, or acquired contemplation or recollection |
| Illuminative | Devotion of Peace | Fourth mansions | 5. infused contemplation or recollection |
| Illuminative | Devotion of Peace | Fourth mansions | 6. prayer of quiet |
| Unitive | Devotion of Union | Fifth mansions | 7. prayer of (simple) union |
| Unitive | Devotion of Ecstasy | Sixth mansions | 8. prayer of conforming or ecstatic union |
| Unitive | Devotion of Ecstasy | Seventh mansions | 9. prayer of transforming union. |

==== Ordinary prayer or ascetical stage ====
===== Mental or meditational prayer =====
Mental prayer is a form of prayer "performed without aid of any particular formula." It is distinguished from vocal prayers, "prayers performed by means of a given formula". Prayer is mental when the thoughts and affections of the soul are not expressed in a previously determined formula. (Note: Leen, Edward, Progress Through Mental Prayer) According to Teresa of Ávila, mental prayer is meditational prayer, in which the person is like a gardener, who, with much labour, draws the water up from the depths of the well to water the plants and flowers. According to Teresa of Avila, mental prayer can proceed by using vocal prayers in order to improve dialogue with God. According to Lehodey, mental prayer can be divided into meditation, more active in reflections, and contemplation, more quiet and gazeful.

===== Natural or acquired contemplation – prayer of simplicity =====
For Teresa of Avila, in natural or acquired contemplation, also called the prayer of simplicity (Note: Catholic Dictionary: Prayer of simplicity: "Meditation replaced by a purer, more intimate prayer consisting in a simple regard or loving thought on God, or on one of his attributes, or on some mystery of the Christian faith. Reasoning is put aside and the soul peacefully attends to the operations of the Spirit with sentiments of love.") there is one dominant thought or sentiment which recurs constantly and easily (although with little or no development) amid many other thoughts, beneficial or otherwise. The prayer of simplicity often has a tendency to simplify itself even in respect to its object, leading one to think chiefly of God and of his presence, but in a confused manner.

In the words of Saint Alphonsus Maria de Liguori, acquired contemplation "consists in seeing at a simple glance the truths which could previously be discovered only through prolonged discourse": reasoning is largely replaced by intuition and affections and resolutions, though not absent, are only slightly varied and expressed in a few words. Similarly, Saint Ignatius of Loyola, in his 30-day retreat or Spiritual Exercises beginning in the "second week" with its focus on the life of Jesus, describes less reflection and more simple contemplation on the events of Jesus' life. These contemplations consist mainly in a simple gaze and include an "application of the senses" to the events, to further one's empathy for Jesus' values, "to love him more and to follow him more closely".

Definitions similar to that of Saint Alphonsus Maria de Liguori are given by Adolphe Tanquerey ("a simple gaze on God and divine things proceeding from love and tending thereto") and Saint Francis de Sales ("a loving, simple and permanent attentiveness of the mind to divine things").

Natural or acquired contemplation has been compared to the attitude of a mother watching over the cradle of her child: she thinks lovingly of the child without reflection and amid interruptions. The Catechism of the Catholic Church states:

What is contemplative prayer? St. Teresa answers: 'Contemplative [sic] (Note: Mental prayer, "oración mental", is not contemplative prayer.) prayer [oración mental] in my opinion is nothing else than a close sharing between friends; it means taking time frequently to be alone with him who we know loves us.' Contemplative prayer seeks him 'whom my soul loves'. It is Jesus, and in him, the Father. We seek him, because to desire him is always the beginning of love, and we seek him in that pure faith which causes us to be born of him and to live in him. In this inner prayer we can still meditate, but our attention is fixed on the Lord himself.

==== Infused or higher contemplation – mystical union ====
According to Hardon, infused contemplation is "A supernatural gift by which a person's mind and will become totally centered on God. Under this influence the intellect receives special insights into things of the spirit, and the affections are extraordinarily animated with divine love. Infused contemplation assumes the free co-operation of the human will." According to Poulain, it is a form of mystical union with God, a union characterized by the fact that it is God, and God only, who manifests Himself. According to Poulain, mystical grace may also manifest as visions of the humanity of Christ or an angel or revelations of a future event, and include miraculous bodily phenomena sometimes observed in ecstatics.

In Teresa's mysticism, infused contemplation is described as a "divinely originated, general, non-conceptual, loving awareness of God". According to Dubay:

It is a wordless awareness and love that we of ourselves cannot initiate or prolong. The beginnings of this contemplation are brief and frequently interrupted by distractions. The reality is so unimposing that one who lacks instruction can fail to appreciate what exactly is taking place. Initial infused prayer is so ordinary and unspectacular in the early stages that many fail to recognize it for what it is. Yet with generous people, that is, with those who try to live the whole Gospel wholeheartedly and who engage in an earnest prayer life, it is common.

According to Thomas Dubay, infused contemplation is the normal, ordinary development of discursive prayer (mental prayer, meditative prayer), which it gradually replaces. Dubay considers infused contemplation as common only among "those who try to live the whole Gospel wholeheartedly and who engage in an earnest prayer life". Other writers view contemplative prayer in its infused supernatural form as far from common. John Baptist Scaramelli, reacting in the 17th century against quietism, taught that asceticism and mysticism are two distinct paths to perfection, the former being the normal, ordinary end of the Christian life, and the latter something extraordinary and very rare. Jordan Aumann considered that this idea of the two paths was "an innovation in spiritual theology and a departure from the traditional Catholic teaching". And Jacques Maritain proposed that one should not say that every mystic necessarily enjoys habitual infused contemplation in the mystical state, since the gifts of the Holy Spirit are not limited to intellectual operations.

===== The Prayer of Quiet =====
For Teresa of Avila, the Prayer of Quiet is a state in which the soul experiences an extraordinary peace and rest, accompanied by delight or pleasure in contemplating God as present. (Note: Jordan Aumann, Grade 6: Prayer of the Quiet) According to Poulain, "Mystical union will be called spiritual quiet when the Divine action is still too weak to prevent distractions: in a word, when the imagination still retains a certain liberty". According to Poulain, in incomplete mystical union, or the prayer of quiet or supernatural recollection, the action of God is not strong enough to prevent distractions, and the imagination still retains a certain liberty.

===== Full or semi-ecstatic union =====
According to Poulain, "Mystical union will be called [...] full union when its strength is so great that the soul is fully occupied with the Divine object, whilst, on the other hand, the senses continue to act (under these conditions, by making a greater or less effort, one can cease from prayer".

===== Ecstatic union =====
According to Poulain, "Mystical union will be called [...] ecstasy when communications with the external world are severed or nearly so (in this event one can no longer make voluntary movement nor energy from the state at will)."

===== Transforming union =====
The transforming union differs from the other three specifically and not merely in intensity. According to Poulain, "It consists in the habitual consciousness of a mysterious grace which all shall possess in heaven: the anticipation of the Divine nature. The soul is conscious of the Divine assistance in its superior supernatural operations, those of the intellect and the will. Spiritual marriage differs from spiritual espousals inasmuch as the first of these states is permanent and the second only transitory."

== Portrayals ==
Portrayals of Teresa include the following:

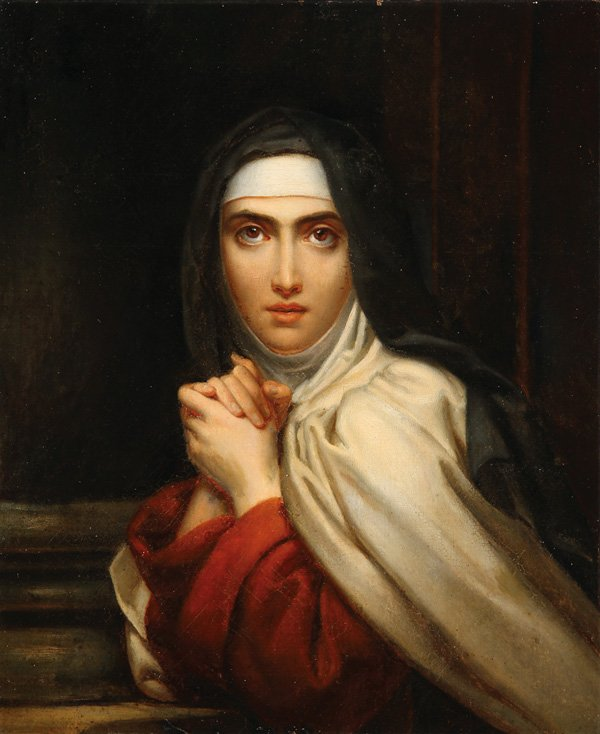
Detail of St. Theresa, 1827, by French painter François Gérard

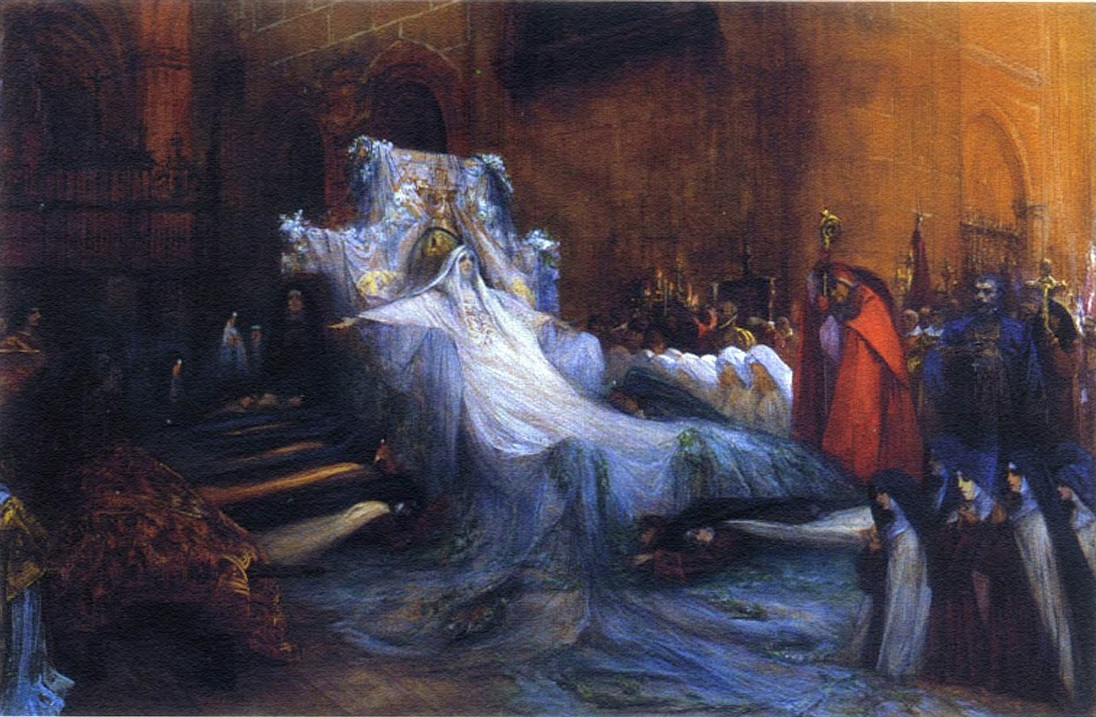
Portrait of Sarah Bernhardt as Thérèse in La Vierge d'Avila by Catulle Mendès (1906)

=== Literature ===
- Simone de Beauvoir singles out Teresa as a woman who truly lived life for herself (and perhaps the only woman to do so) in her book The Second Sex.
- She is mentioned prominently in Kathryn Harrison's novel Poison. The main character, Francisca De Luarca, is fascinated by her life.
- Don DeLillo in End Zone depicted Teresa as a saint who eats from a human skull to remind herself of final things.
- R. A. Lafferty was strongly inspired by El Castillo Interior when he wrote his novel Fourth Mansions. Quotations from St. Teresa's work are frequently used as chapter headings.
- Pierre Klossowski prominently features Saint Teresa of Ávila in his metaphysical novel The Baphomet.
- George Eliot compared Dorothea Brooke to St. Teresa in Middlemarch (1871–1872) and wrote briefly about the life and works of St. Teresa in the "Prelude" to the novel.
- Thomas Hardy took Saint Teresa as the inspiration for much of the characterisation of the heroine Tess (Teresa) Durbeyfield, in Tess of the d'Urbervilles (1891), most notably the scene in which she lies in a field and senses her soul ecstatically above her.
- The contemporary poet Jorie Graham features Saint Teresa in the poem Breakdancing in her volume The End of Beauty.
- Bárbara Mujica's novel Sister Teresa, while not strictly hagiographical, is based upon Teresa's life.
- Timothy Findley's 1999 novel Pilgrim features Saint Teresa as a minor character.
- Vita Sackville-West wrote a double biography contrasting the two Carmelites Teresa of Avila and Thérèse of Lisieux, The Eagle and the Dove, re-issued in 2018.

=== Painting, illustration, and sculpture ===
- Saint Teresa of Ávila's Vision of the Holy Spirit is a 1612–1614 painting by Peter Paul Rubens and is exhibited in the Museum Boijmans Van Beuningen in Rotterdam, and Rubens' c. 1614 painting of the same subject is in the Fitzwilliam Museum, Cambridge.
- Another Rubens portrait of Teresa, from 1615, is now in the collection of the Kunsthistorisches Museum, Vienna.
- Saint Teresa was the inspiration for one of Bernini's most famous sculptures, The Ecstasy of St. Teresa (mid-17th century) in Santa Maria della Vittoria, Rome.
- St. Teresa was painted in 1819–20 by François Gérard, a French neoclassical painter.
- St Theresa of Avila is a 1754–1755 painting by Joseph-Marie Vien and is exhibited in the New Orleans Museum of Art in New Orleans, Louisiana.

==== Iconography ====
Theresa is usually shown in the habit of the Discalced Carmelites, and writing in a book with a quill pen. Sometimes there is a dove, symbolizing the Holy Spirit.

== In art ==
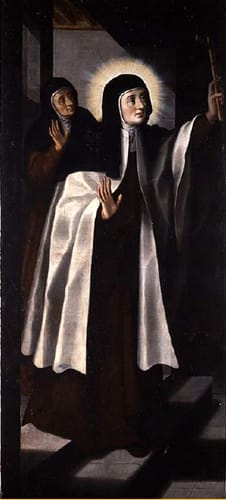
Luis Juárez, Santa Teresa de Jesús (1610–1630)

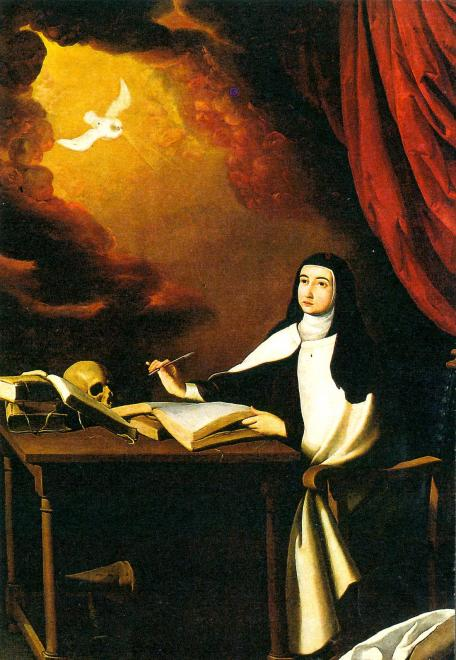
Francisco de Zurbarán, Santa Teresa de Jesús (c. 1650)

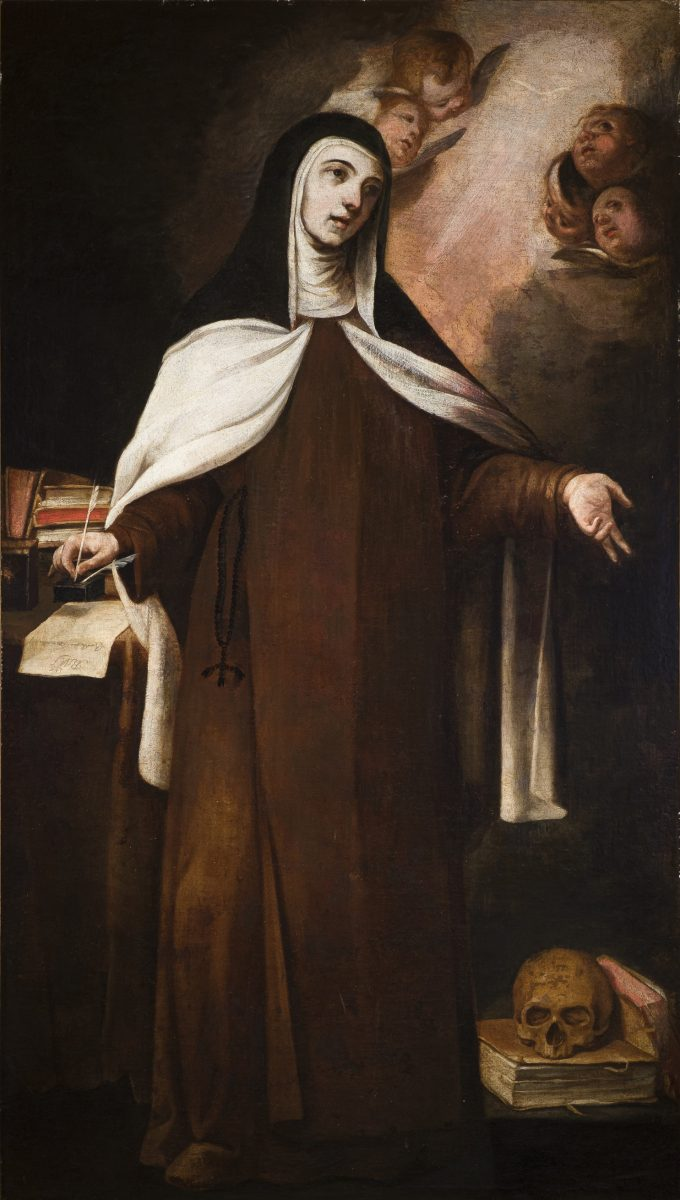
Bartolomé Esteban Murillo, Saint Teresa of Jesus, (c. 1650)

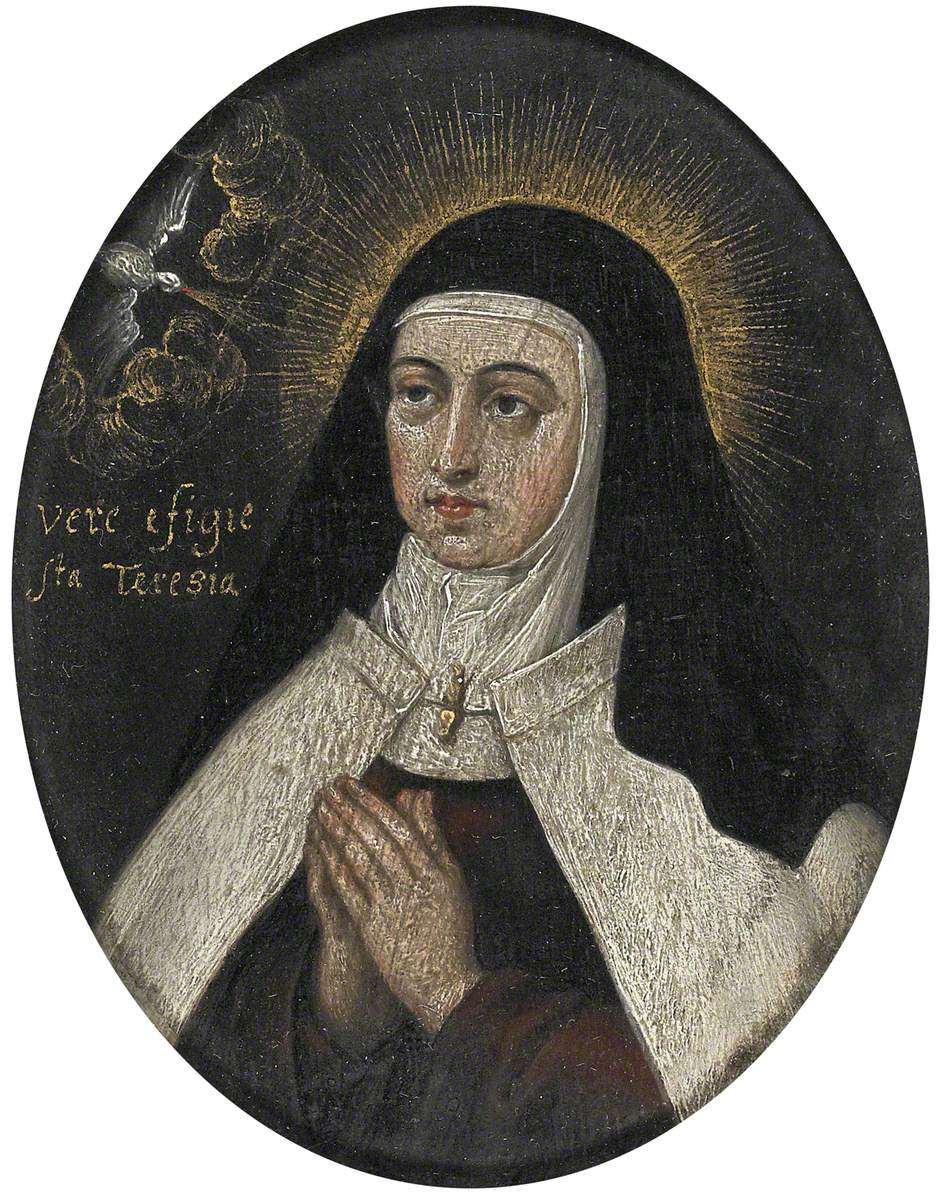
Fray Juan de la Miseria (copy after), Saint Teresa of Ávila (17th c.)

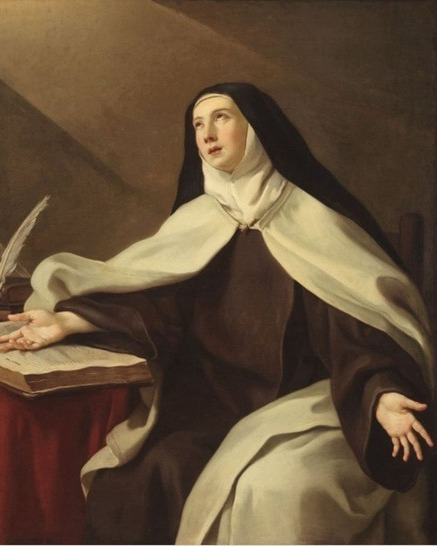
Joseph-Marie Vien, St. Teresa of Avila (18th c.)

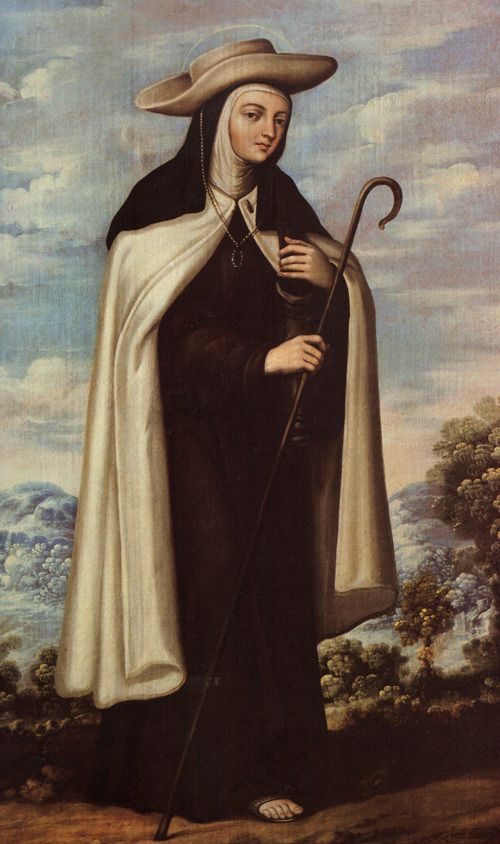
Juan Correa, Holy Mother Teresa as a Pilgrim (late 17th – early 18th c.)

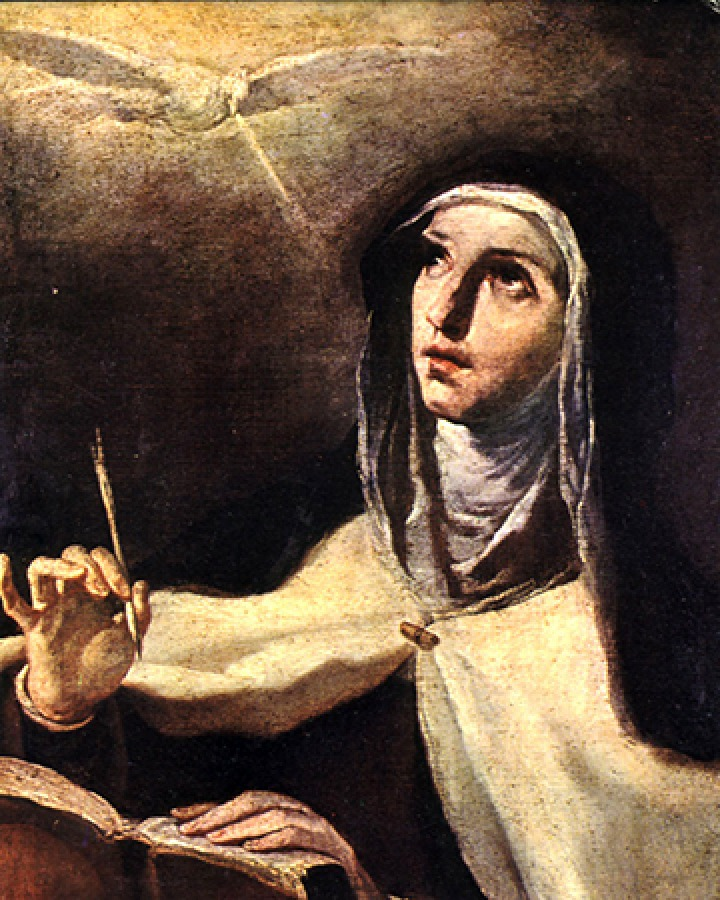
painting of St. Teresa of Avila, Neapolitan or Lombard School (17th c.)

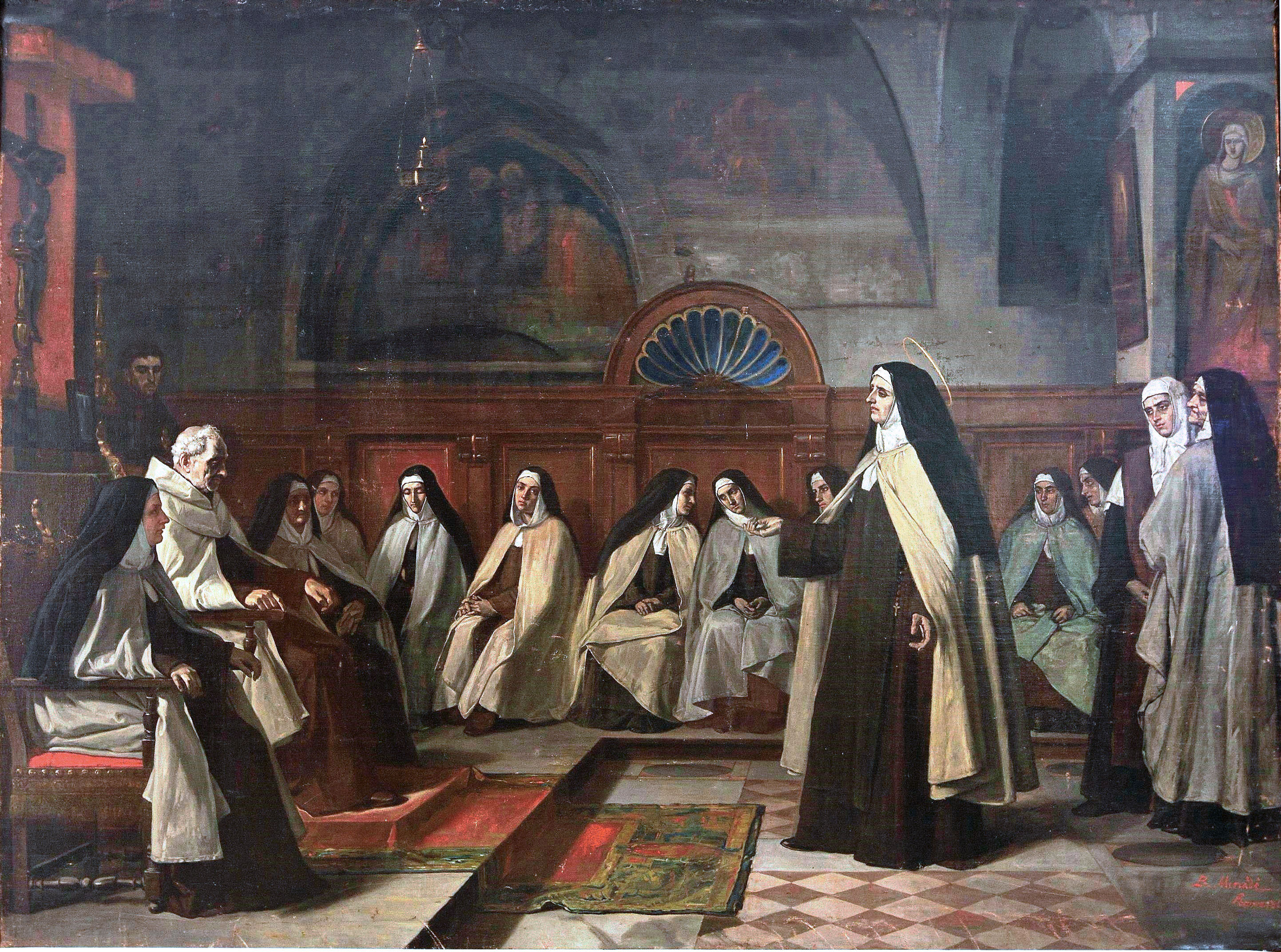
Benet Mercadé, Santa Teresa de Jesús (1868)

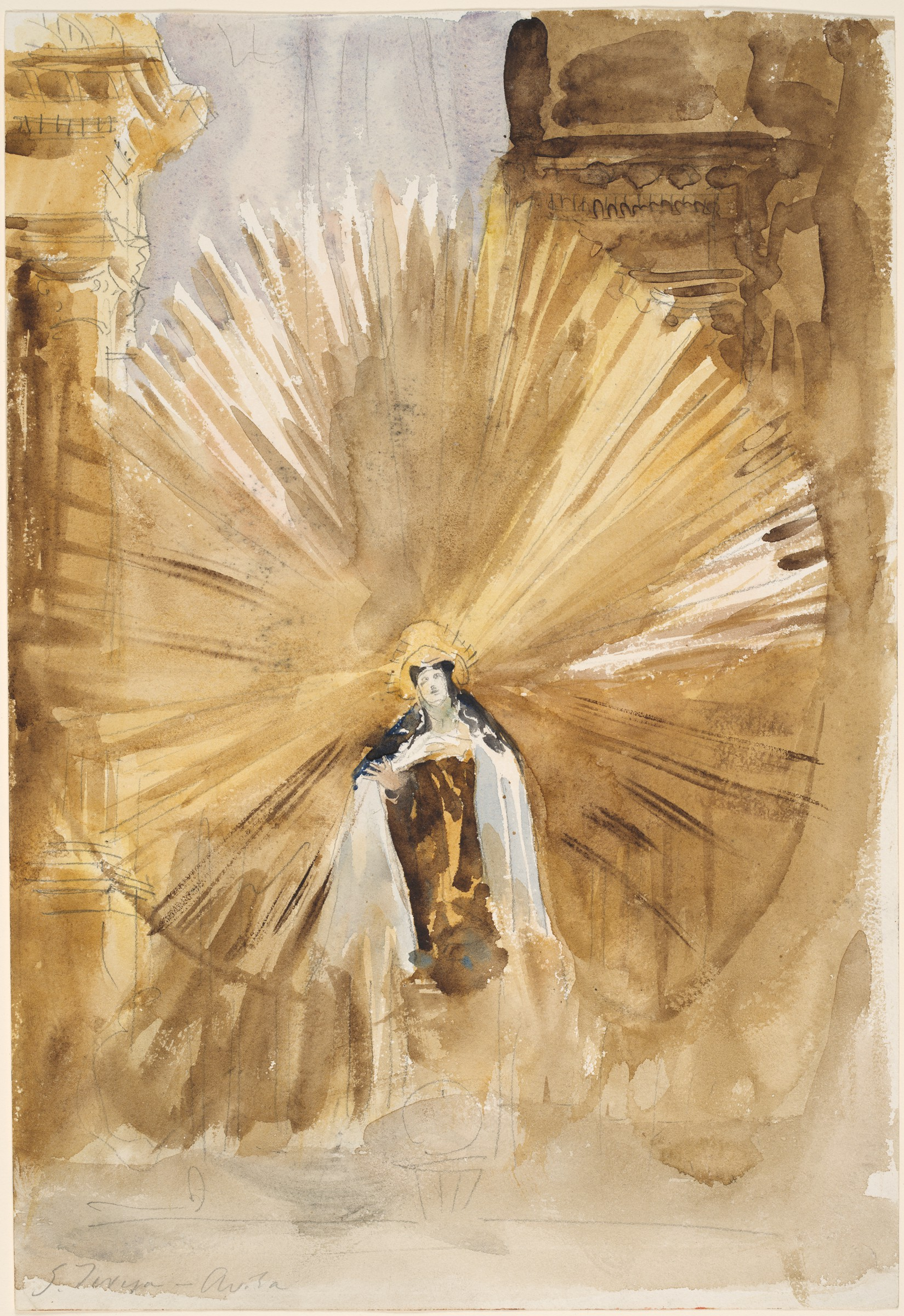
John Singer Sargent, Saint Teresa of Avila (c. 1903)

=== Drama and film ===
- Hugh Ross Williamson wrote a play, Teresa of Avila, about her life, which premiered in London in 1961.
- Performance artist Linda Montano has cited Teresa of Ávila as one of the most important influences on her work and since her return to Catholicism in the 2000s has done performances of her life.
- Teresa de Jesús (1984), directed by Josefina Molina and starring Concha Velasco, is a Spanish made-for-TV mini-series. In it, Teresa is portrayed as the determined foundress of new Carmelite houses while protecting the Infant Jesus statue on her many arduous journeys. The devotion to the Child Jesus spread quickly in Spain, possibly due to her mystical reputation, and then to other places, including France. (Note: Teresa de Jesús at IMDb)
- Nigel Wingrove's 1989 short film Visions of Ecstasy was based on Teresa of Ávila. The film features fantasised sexualised scenes of Teresa with the body of Jesus on the cross. It is the only work to be refused certification by the British Board of Film Classification (BBFC) on the grounds of blasphemy.
- Dževad Karahasan. The Delighted Angel drama about Teresa of Ávila and Rabija al-Adavija, Vienna-Salzburg-Klagenfurt, ARBOS 1995.
- Paz Vega stars as Teresa in Teresa, el cuerpo de Cristo, a 2007 Spanish biopic directed by Ray Loriga.
- St. Teresa also features prominently in the 2009 Ron Howard film, Angels and Demons, where the Bernini sculpture Ecstasy of St. Teresa is an important clue in helping Robert Langdon (Tom Hanks) find an anti-matter bomb that is hidden in and set to destroy the Vatican.
- Marian Álvarez portrays Teresa in the 2015 television film of the same name directed by Jorge Dorado and made for the 500th anniversary of her birth.
- Blanca Portillo, Greta Fernández, and Ainet Jounou portray Teresa in the 2023 film of the same name directed by Paula Ortiz.

=== Music ===
- Marc-Antoine Charpentier composed two motets for the feast of Saint Teresa: Flores, flores o Gallia for two voices, two flutes and continuo (H.374), c. 1680 and the other, for three voices and continuo (H.342), in 1686–87.
- She is a principal character of the opera Four Saints in Three Acts by the composer Virgil Thomson with a libretto by Gertrude Stein.
- Saint Teresa is the subject of the song "Theresa's Sound-World" by Sonic Youth off the 1992 album Dirty, lyrics by Thurston Moore.
- "Saint Teresa" is a track on Joan Osborne's Relish album, nominated for a Grammy Award in 1996.
- References to Saint Theresa and her visions appear in several songs across multiple albums by the Hold Steady, including "Chicago Seemed Tired Last Night", "The Sweet Part of the City", and "Our Whole Lives"
- John Zorn composed a 2021 album entitled Teresa de Avila for a guitar trio consisting of Bill Frisell, Julian Lage, and Gyan Riley. The album is the last of a trilogy inspired by Christian mystical figures.
- "Saint Teresa", as released by indie band Doves, on their 2025 album Constellations for the Lonely.
- Rosalía's track "Sauvignon Blanc", off her 2025 album Lux, was inspired by Saint Teresa and her rejection of material possessions for spiritual love.
- "St. Teresa", as released by Tori Amos, on her 2026 album In Times of Dragons

== See also ==
- Asín on mystical analogies in Saint Teresa of Avila and Islam
- Book of the First Monks
- Byzantine Discalced Carmelites
- Carmelite Rule of St. Albert
- Constitutions of the Carmelite Order
- Mount Carmel#Canaanites
- Secular Order of Discalced Carmelites
- Saints and levitation
- Spanish Renaissance literature
- Teresa de Jesús, 1984 Spanish language mini-series
- St. Teresa's Church (Hong Kong)

== Sources ==
This article was originally based on the text in the Schaff-Herzog Encyclopedia of Religious Knowledge.

Printed sources

- Auclair, Marcelle (1950). La vie de Sainte Thérèse d'Avila, la Dame Errante de Dieu. Paris, France: Éditions du Seuil. OCLC 4154440. (493 pages) French original
- Auclair, Marcelle (1953). Saint Teresa of Avila. First English publication. New York: Pantheon.
- Auclair, Marcelle (1988). Saint Teresa of Avila. Kathleen Pond (trans.) (Reprint of first English publication: New York: Pantheon, 1953 ed.). Petersham, MA: St. Bede's Publications. ISBN 9780932506672. ISBN 0932506674, OCLC 18292197 (457 pages)
- Aumann, Jordan (1980), Spiritual Theology, A&C Black
- Aumann, Jordan (1982). "The Grades of Prayer according to St. Teresa of Avila". Angelicum. 59 (3): 355–371. JSTOR 44615533.
- Balltondre Pla, Mónica (2012). Extasis y visiones: La experiencia contemplativa de Teresa de Ávila (Pensamiento del Presente). Erasmus. ISBN 9788492806980.
- Barton, Marcella Biro (1982). "Saint Teresa of Avila: Did she have Epilepsy?". The Catholic Historical Review. LXVIII (4).
- Beauvoir, Simone de (2011). The Second Sex. Vintage Books. ISBN 978-0-307-27778-7.
- Clissold, Stephen (1982). St. Teresa of Avila (2nd ed.). London: Sheldon. ISBN 0-85969-347-3.
- Counsell, Michael (2011). 2000 Years of Prayer. Hymns Ancient and Modern. ISBN 978-1-85311-623-0.
- Darricau, Raymond (n.d.). "Margaret of the Most Holy Sacrament (Margaret Parigot, 1619-1648)" (PDF). Archived from the original (PDF) on 3 October 2007.
- Detweiler, Robert; Jasper, David (2000). "Teresa of Avila, The Interior Castle". Religion and literature: a reader. Westminster John Knox Press. ISBN 0-664-25846-8.
- Findley, Timothy (1999). Pilgrim. HarperFlamingo Canada. ISBN 978-0-00-224258-5.
- Foa, Anna (2 March 2015). "Teresa's 'marrano' grandfather". Osservatore Romano. Archived from the original on 17 November 2017.
- Garriga Espino, Ana (10 December 2015). "El desafío editorial de las cartas de Teresa de Jesús" (PDF). Edad de Oro (in Spanish). 35 (10). Autonomous University of Madrid: 35–53. doi:10.15366/edadoro2015.34.002. hdl:10486/671610. ISSN 0212-0429. OCLC 5998749260.
- Graham, Jorie (1999) [1987]. The End of Beauty. New York City: HarperCollins. ISBN 978-0-880-01616-2.
- Harrison, Kathryn (1995). Poison. Random House. ISBN 978-0-679-43140-4.
- Herzog, Johann Jakob; Schaff, Philip; Hauck, Albert (1908), The new Schaff-Herzog encyclopedia of religious knowledge Volume 11, New York: Funk and Wagnalls Co.
- Hollenback, Jess Byron (1996), Mysticism: Experience, Response, and Empowerment, Penn State Press
- Hontiveros, Romeo (14 October 2016). "Readings & Reflections: Saturday of the Twenty-eighth Week in Ordinary Time & St. Teresa of Avila, October 15,2016". pagadiandiocese.org.
- Howell, James C. (2009). Introducing Christianity: Exploring the Bible, Faith, and Life. Westminster John Knox Press. ISBN 978-0-664-23297-9.
- Hsia, R. Po-chia (2004). A Companion to the Reformation World. Wiley. ISBN 978-0-631-22017-6.
- Ibáñez, Pedro (1882). La Vida de la Santa Madre Teresa de Jesús (in Spanish). Madrid.; English translation Ibáñez, Pedro (1888). The Life of S. Teresa of Jesus. London: Burns, Oates,& Co.
- Jansen, Gary (2018). Life Everlasting: Catholic Devotions and Mysteries for the Everyday Seeker. Penguin. ISBN 978-0-525-50386-6.
- Jordanova, Ludmilla (2012). The Look of the Past: Visual and Material Evidence in Historical Practice. Cambridge: University Press. ISBN 978-0-521-70906-4.
- Kavanaugh, Kieran; Rodgriguez, Otilio (1991). The Collected Works of Saint John of the Cross (3rd ed.). ICS Publications. ISBN 978-0-935216-14-1.
- Kirvan, John (1996). Let Nothing Disturb You: A Journey to the Center of the Soul with Teresa of Avila. Ave Maria Press. ISBN 978-0-87793-570-4.
- Klossowski, Pierre (1998). The Baphomet. Marsilio. ISBN 978-1-56886-056-5.
- Knowles, Elizabeth (2009). Oxford Dictionary of Quotations. Oxford: University Press. ISBN 978-0-19-923717-3.
- Knowles, Alison; Heartney, Eleanor; Monk, Meredith; Montano, Linda; Ehn, Erik (September 2002). "Art as spiritual practice". PAJ: A Journal of Performance and Art. 24 (3): 18–34. doi:10.1162/15202810260186620. JSTOR 3246344. S2CID 57572255.
- Lafferty, R. A. (1999). Fourth Mansions. Wildside. ISBN 978-1-880448-96-0.
- Lehfeldt, Elizabeth A. (2017). Religious Women in Golden Age Spain: The Permeable Cloister. Taylor & Francis. ISBN 978-1-351-90454-4.
- Lehodey, Domitry V. (1982). The Ways of Mental Prayer. Tan. ISBN 978-0-89555-178-8.
- Maynard, Lee Anna (2009). Beautiful Boredom: Idleness and Feminine Self-Realization in the Victorian Novel. McFarland. ISBN 978-0-7864-4555-4.
- McLean, Julienne (2003). Towards Mystical Union: A Modern Commentary on the Mystical Text "The Interior Castle" by St. Teresa of Avila. St Paul's. ISBN 978-0-8543-9661-0.
- Medwick, Cathleen (1999). "Expeditions". Teresa of Avila: The Progress of a Soul. Knopf. ISBN 0-394-54794-2.
- Mercer, Christia (2017). "Descartes' debt to Teresa of Ávila, or why we should work on women in the history of philosophy". Philosophical Studies. 174 (10): 2539–2555. doi:10.1007/s11098-016-0737-9. S2CID 171117738.
- Merton, Thomas (2008), An Introduction to Christian Mysticism. Initiation into the Monastic Tradition 3, Cisterian Publications
- Moore, Kevin Z. (1990). The Descent of the Imagination: Postromantic Culture in the Later Novels of Thomas Hardy. NYU Press. ISBN 978-0-8147-5451-1.
- Pirlo, Fr. Paolo O. (1997). "St. Teresa of Avila". My First Book of Saints. Sons of Holy Mary Immaculate – Quality Catholic Publications. p. 241. ISBN 971-91595-4-5.
- Park, Josephine Nock-Hee (2009). "The Orients of Gertrude Stein". College Literature. 36 (3): 28–44. ISSN 0093-3139. JSTOR 20642036.
- Pope Paul VI (27 September 1970a). "Proclamazione di Santa Teresa d'Ávila Dottore della Chiesa" [Proclamation of Saint Teresa of Avila as a Doctor of the Church]. La Santa Sede (in Italian).
- Pope Paul VI (3 October 1970b). "Proclamazione di Santa Caterina da Siena Dottore della Chiesa" [Proclamation of Saint Catherine of Siena as a Doctor of the Church]. La Santa Sede (in Italian).
- Poulain, Augustin (1908). "Contemplation". The Catholic Encyclopedia. New York: Robert Appleton Company. Archived from the original on 13 January 2012.
- Rodriguez, Javier Alvarez (2007), Epilepsy and Mysticism, pp. 59–69
- Rowe, Erin Kathleen (2011). Saint and Nation: Santiago, Teresa of Avila, and Plural Identities in Early Modern Spain. Penn State University Press. ISBN 978-0-271-07815-1.
- Sackville-West, Vita (2011). The Eagle and the Dove. Pan Macmillan. ISBN 978-1-4472-1434-2.
- Salamony, Ryan (2017). The Compassionate Mother of Carmel: Teresa of Avila and the Carmelite Model for Twenty-First-Century Seekers (PDF) (Senior). Goucher College. hdl:11603/3898. Archived (PDF) from the original on 22 July 2018.
- Santini, M. (1995), The Holy Infant of Prague, Prague: Martin
- Simler, Joseph (2009), Catechism of Mental Prayer, TAN Books
- Teresa of Ávila (1921). Benedict Zimmerman (ed.). The Interior Castle. Translated by The Benedictines of Stanbrook. London: Thomas Baker.
- Teresa of Ávila; Zimmerman, Benedict (1997). Life of St. Teresa of Jesus. Tan Books. ISBN 978-0-89555-603-5.
- Teresa of Ávila (2007). The Way of Perfection. Translated by Benedictines of Stanbrook. Cosimo, Inc. ISBN 978-1-60206-261-0.
- Thouless, Robert Henry (1971). An introduction to the psychology of religion. CUP Archive. ISBN 0-521-09665-0.
- Tommasini, Anthony (1998). Virgil Thomson: Composer on the Aisle. New York: W. W. Norton & Company. ISBN 9780393318586.
- Wallenfang, Donald; Wallenfang, Megan (2021), Shoeless: Carmelite Spirituality in a Disquieted World, Wipf and Stock Publishers
- Williams, Rowan (2004). Teresa of Avila. London: Continuum International Publishing Group. ISBN 978-0-8264-7341-7.
- Wong, Anders (n.d.). "History of the Infant Jesus of Prague". ewtn.com. Archived from the original on 30 June 2005.
- Wyhe, Cordula van (2008), Female Monasticism in Early Modern Europe: An Interdisciplinary View, Ashgate Publishing, Ltd
- Wynne, J (1911). "Prayer". The Catholic Encyclopedia. New York: Robert Appleton Company.
- Zimmerman, Benedict (1912). "St. Teresa of Jesus". The Catholic Encyclopedia. Vol. 14. New York: Robert Appleton Company.

Web-sources
