= Montezuma =

Montezuma or Moctezuma may refer to:

== People ==
- Moctezuma I (1398–1469), the second Aztec emperor and fifth king of Tenochtitlan
- Moctezuma II (c. 1460–1520), ninth Aztec emperor
  - Pedro Moctezuma, a son of Montezuma II
  - Isabel Moctezuma (1509/1510–1550/1551), a daughter of Montezuma II
    - Leonor Cortés Moctezuma (c. 1528–?), daughter of Hernán Cortés and Isabel Montezuma
      - Isabel de Tolosa Cortés de Moctezuma (1568–1619/1620), Mexican heiress, great-granddaughter of Montezuma II
- Duke of Moctezuma de Tultengo, a Spanish hereditary title held by descendants of Moctezuma II
- Carlos Montezuma (c. 1860–1923), Yavapai/Apache Native American activist
- Carlos López Moctezuma (1909–1980), Mexican film actor
- Eduardo Matos Moctezuma (born 1940), Mexican archaeologist
- Esteban Moctezuma (born 1954), Mexican politician
- Julio Rodolfo Moctezuma (1927–2000), Mexican lawyer, politician and banker
- Leonidas de Montezuma (1869–1937), English cricketer
- Moctesuma Esparza (born 1949), American film director
- Moctezuma Serrato (born 1976), Mexican football player
- Montezuma Fuller (1858–1926), American architect

== Places ==
=== Mexico ===
- Moctezuma, Sonora, a municipality
- Moctezuma, San Luis Potosí, a municipality
- Moctezuma River
- Moctezuma River (Sonora)
- Moctezuma metro station, a station on the Mexico City Metro
- Moctezuma (Mexico City Metrobús, Line 4), a BRT station in Mexico City
- Moctezuma (Mexico City Metrobús, Line 5), a BRT station in Mexico City

=== United States ===
==== Inhabited places ====
- Montezuma, Tuolumne County, California, a ghost town
- Montezuma Hills, California
- Montezuma, Colorado, a Statutory Town
- Montezuma County, Colorado
- Montezuma, Georgia, a city
- Montezuma Township, Pike County, Illinois
- Montezuma, Indiana, a town
- Montezuma, Iowa, a city
- Montezuma Township, Gray County, Kansas
  - Montezuma, Kansas, a city
- Montezuma, New Mexico, an unincorporated community
- Montezuma, New York, a town
- Montezuma, North Carolina, an unincorporated community
- Montezuma, Ohio, a village
- Montezuma, Virginia, an unincorporated community

==== Buildings ====
- Montezuma (Norwood, Virginia), a home
- Montezuma Castle (hotel), Las Vegas, New Mexico

==== Natural formations ====
- Montezuma Creek (Utah), a creek in Utah
- Montezuma Marsh, Cayuga Lake, New York
- Montezuma National Forest, Colorado
- Montezuma National Wildlife Refuge, New York
- Montezuma Peak, a mountain in Arizona
- Montezuma Range, Nevada, a mountain range
- Montezuma Well, a natural limestone sinkhole near Rimrock, Arizona

=== Other countries ===
- Montezuma, Minas Gerais, Brazil
- Montezuma, Costa Rica
- Montezuma Falls, Tasmania, Australia

== Music ==
- Montezuma, hero of a 1695 semi-opera The Indian Queen by Henry Purcell
- Motezuma, a 1733 opera by Antonio Vivaldi (until recently known under the title Montezuma)
- Montezuma (Graun), a 1755 opera by Carl Heinrich Graun
- Motezuma, a 1765 opera by Gian Francesco de Majo
- Motezuma (Mysliveček), a 1771 opera by Josef Mysliveček
- Montezuma, a 1775 opera by Antonio Sacchini
- Montezuma, a 1780 opera by Giacomo Insanguine
- Montesuma, a 1781 opera by Niccolò Antonio Zingarelli
- Montezuma, by Ignaz von Seyfried (1804)
- Montezuma, an 1884 opera by Frederick Grant Gleason
- Montezuma (Sessions opera), 1963, by Roger Sessions
- Montezuma, or La Conquista, a 2005 opera by Lorenzo Ferrero
- Montezuma, a 1980 film score by Hans Werner Henze
- "Montezuma", a song from the 1994 album Apurimac II by Cusco
- "Montezuma", a song from the 2011 album Helplessness Blues by Fleet Foxes

== Ships ==
- Montezuma (ship)
- USS Montezuma, three ships of the US Navy
- SS Montezuma, launched 1899, later RFA Abadol and RFA Oakleaf

== Other uses ==
- Montezuma (TV programme), a 2009 British documentary
- Montezuma (mythology), in the mythology of certain Amerindian tribes of the Southwest US
- U.D. Moctezuma de Orizaba, a defunct Mexican football team
- Montezuma, a brand of tequila by Barton Brands

== See also ==
- Montezuma Affair, an 1835 naval battle between Mexico and the US
- Montezuma's revenge (disambiguation)
- Halls of Montezuma (disambiguation)
- Montezuma leopard frog, a species of frog
- Montezuma oropendola, a species of bird
- Montezuma, a synonym of the plant genus Thespesia
- Montezuma pine, a species of conifer
