= Montezuma (ship) =

Several vessels have been named Montezuma (or Moctezuma):

- Montezuma (1804 ship) was launched in Philadelphia in 1804. She came into British hands c.1807 after having been seized for attempting to evade the British East India Company's monopoly on British trade with India. She then initially traded with Charleston until 1811 when she went whaling in the Galápagos Islands. There the Americans captured her in 1813. Her captors sailed her to Valparaíso where the Spanish colonial government seized her. Montezuma became Moctezuma and served as a sloop of the First Chilean Navy Squadron. The Chilean Navy sold her in 1828 and she returned to mercantile service.
- Montezuma (1822 ship) was launched in Philadelphia in 1822 as a packet ship. In 1841 her owner sold her and she became a whaler operating out of New London, Connecticut. Between 1841 and 1861 she made six voyages to the Indian Ocean, the Pacific, and the Bering Sea. Late in 1861, during the American Civil War, the United States Navy purchased her to sink her in January 1862 as a harbour obstruction.
- SS Montezuma, launched 1899, later RFA Abadol and RFA Oakleaf

== See also ==
- USS Montezuma, any one of three ships of the United States Navy
