= Alonso de Grado =

Alonso de Grado was a Spanish hidalgo, explorer, and conqueror of the 16th century, who participated with Hernan Cortés in the conquest of the Aztec Empire. He was born in Alcántara (Cáceres, Spain) around 1490. He was described as:

"Of short and sturdy complexion. Broad. Thick skin. Clear mind and little doctrine. Clever, canny, fearless, and bit haughty".

Other companion described him as:

"A noisy man, frivolous, but brave and sharp", " a man of many skills and talents, but with a restless soul". Cousin of Diego Pizarro, he departed for the new world out of adventure lust.

== Conquest of the Aztec Empire ==
Captain De Grado was one of the few Spanish who dismembered with Cortés in Anahuac in 1519. Cortés "kept him by his side at all times, trusted his judgement and asked for his advice in difficult times".

He took part in the foundation of Vera Cruz. He took part in the Cholula massacre, where the Spanish fell into a trap of the Aztecs, and distinguished himself in the struggle by keeping a calm mind.

He was one of the 30 Castilian soldiers that recommended Cortés to take a "preventive action" to keep this events from happening again. The 30 of them and Cortés entered the palace, captured Emperor Moctezuma II, and took them to Cortés, where the Emperor lost his life.

Alonso was there during the Noche Triste, and during the Great Battle of Otumba, where the Spanish managed to defeat a much larger force by leading them to an open field, a terrain that favoured them.

In 1522 Alonso joined the expedition of Gonzalo de Sandoval to found the village of Espíritu Santo- so named because it was founded during the Pascua of Pentecost – a settlement with commercial intent. He was among its first inhabitants.

In 1523 one of Cortés' captains, Cristóbal de Olid, betrayed Cortés by creating a personal alliance with Cuba's governor to conquer and split Honduras among themselves. Don Alonso took part in Olid's persecution, and once this chase was done and De Olid was in chains, he joined Luis Marín in the "conquest and unification" of Chiapas. As a reward for this he was promised the encomienda – Spanish for "being in charge of" or "being the protector of" – of half of the population or the region. However, he was accused of not respecting the laws of Burgos and mistreating his subjects. He was put under arrest and locked up by Cortés while an investigation on the charges was carried on.

In 1525 he married the Aztec princess Isabel de Moctezuma. Shortly after, Cortés gave him the title of Visitador General of New Spain. He had the special duty of traveling the kingdom, "ensuring the good treatment of natives, and prosecuting illegal enslavement", under the Laws of Burgos.

Alonso died while fulfilling this duty at some time prior to 1527.
