= Juan de Tolosa =

16th-century Spanish conquistador

- Born: c. 1515; Tolosa, Spain
- Died: before 1594 (aged 78-79)
- Spouse: Leonor Cortés Moctezuma
- Children: Juan de Tolosa Cortés de Moctezuma; Leonor de Tolosa Cortés Moctezuma; Isabel de Tolosa Cortés de Moctezuma
- Relatives: Hernán Cortés (father-in-law); Isabel Moctezuma (mother-in-law); Juan de Oñate (son-in-law)

Juan de Tolosa (c. 1515 – before 1594) was a Spanish Basque conquistador. He discovered rich silver deposits near the present day city of Zacatecas, Mexico, in 1546.

== Early life ==
Juan de Tolosa was born in the sixteenth century in or near Tolosa, Spain. He took the nickname of "Barbalonga" in recognition of his impressive beard. He emigrated to New Spain (later known as Mexico).

== Founder of Zacatecas ==
Tolosa's date of arrival in the Americas is unknown although he was apparently a soldier during the Mixtón War from 1540 to 1542. After the war, Tolosa led several expeditions in search of silver along with Miguel de Ibarra and a contingent of Spanish soldiers and Indian slaves. In what is now Tlaltenango, Indians showed him rocks containing silver and, on September 8, 1546, he found his way to the origin of the rocks on the Cerro de la Bufa at Zacatecas. With Ibarra he collected a group of miners and returned to the site to exploit the silver deposits which turned out to be the richest in Mexico. On January 20, 1548 Tolosa along with Diego de Ibarra, Cristóbal de Oñate, and Baltazar de Bañuelos Temiño officially founded what is now the city of Zacatecas, later known as the "Civilized North." This city is recognized today by UNESCO as a World Heritage Site.

Tolosa also claimed credit for discovering rich deposits of silver at San Martin, Sombrerete, and Avino 115 miles north-west of Zacatecas in 1556. Along with Luis Cortés, the son of conquistador Hernán Cortés, and 40 soldiers he reportedly explored for six months at his own cost before finding the silver deposit. His primacy in the discovery of the silver at San Martin has been disputed. On another expedition he made an important discovery of salt deposits at Salinas de Santa Maria.

Tolosa was apparently not as good a businessman as he was explorer, as he owned fewer mines and smelters than other early mining entrepreneurs in Zacatecas. In 1594, his children and other witnesses claimed that he had died in poverty, spending the fortune he had made in Zacatecas on expeditions to find new mines. His children, left "without means and in need" requested assistance from the Spanish crown in recognition of his contributions.

== Personal life ==
In 1550, Tolosa married Leonor Cortés Moctezuma, born out of wedlock and the daughter of Isabel Moctezuma and Hernán Cortés. The couple had a son, Juan de Tolosa Cortés Moctezuma, and two daughters, Isabel de Tolosa Cortés de Moctezuma who married Juan de Oñate Salazar and Leonor de Tolosa Cortés Moctezuma who married Cristobal de Zaldivar Mendoza. Other daughters, names unknown, were said to live in a monastery in Seville, Spain in 1604.

== Death ==
The date of Tolosa's death is unknown, although both he and his wife died before 1594. In 1576, a Matías de Tolosa requested an emigration licence in order to assist his "rich brother Juan" in New Spain. The request is accompanied by a letter written from Acapulco indicating a significant personal network to assist Juan, and it makes an identification likely.
