= Mariana Leonor Moctezuma =

Aztec princess (1505–1562)

- Born: c. 1505
- Died: 1562
- Spouses: Juan Paez (m. 1527; died 1529); Cristobal de Valderrama (m. 1531; died 1537)
- Children: Leonor Valderrama y Moctezuma; Cristobal Huanitzin Valderrama Moctezuma
- Parent(s): Moctezuma II (father); Acatlan (mother)
- Relatives: Isabel Moctezuma (half-sister); Pedro Moctezuma (half-brother)

Mariana or Marina Leonor Moctezuma (c.1505–1562) was a daughter of Aztec Emperor Moctezuma II. She survived the destruction of the Aztec Empire by the Spanish and allied indigenous peoples, plus a concurrent smallpox epidemic that killed one-half of the Aztecs in the Valley of Mexico. Her Aztec name is unknown, but she used the Spanish name Mariana in the 1520s and began using the name Leonor in the 1530s. Mariana's mother was a lesser wife of Moctezuma called Acatlan. She was one of three surviving children of Moctezuma II, the others being her half-sister Isabel Moctezuma and her half brother, Pedro. Isabel was a concubine of conqueror Hernan Cortés and bore him a child. Isabel was higher in the social structure of the Aztecs than Mariana but the Spanish awarded all three children encomiendas (landed estates) and they and their descendants were given rights and privileges as royal persons.

In 1527, Cortés ordered Mariana to marry a Spanish soldier named Juan Paez. As a dowry she received the encomienda of Ecatepec in the Valley of Mexico about 20 km (12 miles) north of the Mexico City of that era. Unlike grants of encomiendas to Spanish soldiers, the grants to Mariana and her two siblings were inheritable which gave them a unique history. Ecatepec was called a "Republic of Indians" referring to the Aztec heritage of Mariana and the indigenous inhabitants. Paez died in 1529. In 1531, Mariana married Cristobal de Valderrama, a native of Burgos, Spain, and a soldier who possessed several encomiendas in Colima and was awarded the encomienda of Tarimbaro in Michoacán. The couple had two children, a girl Leonor Valderrama y Moctezuma (born 1532) and a boy Cristobal Huanitzin Valderrama Moctezuma. Leonor Valderrama was the heir to the Ecatepec encomienda and Cristobal inherited the rich encomienda of Tarimbaro. Mariana's second husband, Cristobal, died in 1537. Mariana died in 1562 as did her daughter and heir to Ecatepec. What followed was an endless battle among heirs to the encomienda which continued until the 18th century

The life and families of half-sisters, Isabel and Mariana, are prominent examples of mestizaje – melding Spanish and indigenous Mexican ancestries – which would characterize the future of Mexico.
