= Coyote (mythology) =

North American mythological character

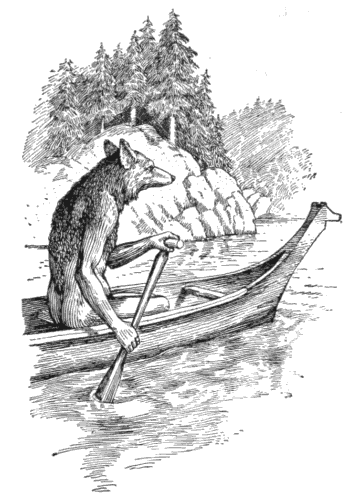
Coyote canoeing, in a traditional story

Coyote is a mythological character common to many cultures of the Indigenous peoples of North America , based on the coyote (Canis latrans) animal. This character is usually male and is generally anthropomorphic, although he may have some coyote-like physical features such as fur, pointed ears, yellow eyes, a tail and blunt claws. The myths and legends which include Coyote vary widely from culture to culture.

The role Coyote takes in traditional stories shares some traits with the Raven figure in other cultures.

== Coyoteway ==
Coyote is the tutelary spirit of "Coyoteway", one of the Navajo curing ceremonies. The ceremony is intended to restore the patient's harmonious relationship with Coyote and the world, and to bring about a return to good health.

== By culture ==
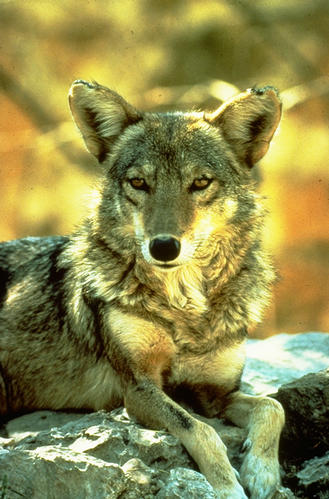
The coyote (Canis latrans), the animal on which the myths are based

Coyote is featured in the mythology of a number of Indigenous cultures of the Americas, including:

=== California ===
Coyote is featured in the mythology of numerous peoples from the area covered by the modern state of California, including the Achomawi and Atsugewi, the Chumash, the Diegueños, the Gallinoméro, the Juaneño, the Karok, the Luiseño, the Maidu, the Miwuk, the Pomo, the Rumsen, the Shasta, the Sinkyone, the Wappo, the Yana, and the Yokuts. In many of these stories he is a major sacred character with divine creative powers; in others he is a malevolent and often comical trickster. In some stories he combines both roles.

An example is a Maidu myth that says that at the beginning of time, a primal being called Earth Maker is floating on the infinite waters, when Coyote calls out to him. Together they sing to create the world. After it is completed, and Earth Maker has created the people, Coyote vows to spoil the world and introduce evil to it. Earth Maker orders the people to destroy Coyote, but despite their best efforts, Coyote uses supernatural trickery to outwit them. In the end, Earth Maker is forced to recognize that Coyote's power is equal to his own.

A common theme is of Coyote benefiting the human community by organizing the theft of fire, or of the sun, from the supernatural beings who have been keeping it for themselves; in these myths he is portrayed as a benefactor of the people. In a Shasta myth, Coyote saves the world from ten evil moons which have afflicted it with everlasting winter.

In a Miwok myth, Coyote creates all animals, then calls them to a council to discuss the creation of human beings. Each animal wants people to be imbued with its own best qualities, causing an argument. Coyote mocks them all, vowing that human beings should have their own wit and cunning. Each animal makes a human model in their own likeness; but overnight Coyote destroys the other models, so that only his own model comes to life.

A Maidu myth says that as the Creator was fashioning various creatures out of clay, Coyote tried to do the same. However, as he kept laughing, his efforts did not turn out well. The Creator supposed that if he stopped laughing, he might do better. Coyote denied laughing - thus telling the world's first lie.

Some stories depict Coyote as the embodiment of evil lechery: a serial rapist who uses trickery to attack a variety of victims including, for example, his own mother-in-law and his sister. Such tales may have served to reinforce the community moral code, by using outrageous humor to portray examples of intolerable behavior.

Great Basin

Coyote is featured in myths of the Chemehuevi, Paiute, Shoshone and Ute peoples. In this region most of the stories feature him as a malevolent and lecherous trickster. However, there are some echoes of his divine role as expressed in the myths of California, in particular obtaining fire for the people.

==== Origin of the Horse ====
One such myth from the Chemehuevi involves Coyote enlisting the help of other animals in order to achieve his goals. In the latter half of a myth called "Coyote Went to get Basketry Material" Coyote enlists the help of the Black Spider and Parotsokitapitsi, an unknown bird species, to take revenge on the Sky-Down-feather-Brothers for killing his grandson. This myth also involves Coyote discovering the first horse, who happens to be his own grandson.

It begins with Coyote's grandson being sent by his mother to go see Coyote and before the grandson leaves he is explicitly told not to enter a cave that lies between his mother's house and Coyote's house. However, after the grandson had traveled for some time it began to get dark and rain began to fall. Deciding to disobey his mother's instruction, the grandson spends the night and the subsequent morning in the cave.

When the youth awakens, he finds that his head feels heavy, his hands now look completely different, and he is covered in hair. As he leaves the cave, he is approached by some mountain sheep (bighorn sheep) who accompany him on his journey to his grandfather's house. When he reaches Coyote's home, Coyote sees them coming and notices that one of the mountain sheep is much bigger than the rest. He plans on killing the big one before Wolf tells him that that mountain sheep is actually his own grandson and urges him to not only not kill it, but also to feed the big mountain sheep bunchgrass. Coyote obliges and decides to settle for killing some of the smaller mountain sheep instead. After eating, his grandson goes off to spend the night with the other mountain sheep before returning in the morning. Once again, Coyote kills some of the smaller sheep and feeds the biggest one some bunchgrass. This same process repeats itself several times with Coyote gaining an enormous amount of meat.

One morning, however, the big mountain sheep is spied by the two Sky-Down-feather-Brothers. The eldest, knowing who the big mountain sheep really is, plans on leaving him alone but the younger brother ignores his older brother's warning and decides to kill the big mountain sheep. After shooting the big mountain sheep the younger brother finds that his big catch has suddenly turned into a boy wearing moccasins. The two brothers then butcher the body and fly away. The following morning Wolf mourns the loss of their grandson and devises a plan for revenge. Wolf tells Coyote to hide almost all the water, have the Black Spider spin a web to fill the sky's hole, and to hide near the little water still uncovered with Parotsokitapitsi with a hot rock from a fire pit. Coyote agrees to this plan but before he sets it in motion, he goes to the spot where his grandson was killed where he finds some blood and a little bit of hair which he packs in a basket before leaving.

Coyote asks the Black Spider to make a web out of cooked sinew and the spider agrees to help him. He then asks Parotsokitapitsi to accompany him at the edge of the water and shout when the Sky-Down-feather brothers try to fly away in order to keep them in place and he also agrees to do this. Eventually, both of the Sky-Down-feather-brothers get thirsty and search for some water to drink. The younger brother quickly spots the water where Coyote is hiding and suggests they land there to drink but the elder brother knows better and tells his brother that that is where Coyote is hiding, waiting for them. The brothers then try to trick Coyote multiple times by flying close to the water and saying, "Oh, Coyote, sitting by a roasting pit heating a stone!" Each time, Coyote almost reveals himself thinking he has been discovered but each time Parotsokitapitsi stops him telling him that the brothers are trying to trick him. Finally, the two brothers stop to drink and in that moment, Coyote throws the hot stone at them and Parotsokitapitsi shouts as they try to fly away and the brothers become trapped in the web blocking the sky's hole. Then, Black Spider climbs down the web and bites the brothers on their necks and they both fall back down to the ground.

The story concludes with Coyote going to where he had left his grandson's remains only to find that his grandson had been revived and was gone. Coyote deduces that his grandson has become a horse due to the fact that all the grass in the surrounding area had been eaten.

=== Plateau ===
Myths and stories of Coyote are also found in the cultures of the Plateau area: the Chinookan (including the Wishram people and the Multnomah), the Flathead, the Nez Perce, the Nlaka'pamux, the Syilx (Okanagan), the St'at'imc, the Tsilhqot'in, and the Yakama.

One story from the Chinookan describes Coyote's attempts to catch salmon. After repeated failures, Coyote defecates and his own feces begin to insult him. Eventually, his feces stops insulting him and offers detailed advice not only for catching the salmon, but also for preparing the fish once he has them. Coyote enjoys success for a while before he begins to fail once again. Coyote stops and, as before, defecates again. This batch of feces tells Coyote that there are even more aspects he has to take into consideration when fishing including specific instructions for specific geographic location. The story concludes with Coyote finally understanding how to fish properly but thoroughly exhausted.

Sk'elep is the traditional trickster figure in Secwepemc mythology. He is featured in many legends and has many powers, including the ability to die and come back to life. Like the animal his character is enjoined to, he is very clever. But like all intelligent beings, he can also have his foolish moments and can make emblematic mistakes that people can learn from. According to one story, he once decided that he had to climb into a tree and spin a web like a spider. The only result of this misguided idea was that he left behind clumps of his hair in the tree. This magical hair, however, became wila, the Secwepemc language for a species of lichen.

In some other Interior Salish cultures, Coyote went into the tree for other reasons; for example, in Colville-Okanagan culture, he was dropped into the tree by some swans he had grabbed in a hunt. In this story also, though, his hair became the hair moss lichen.

Between the Fraser and Columbia rivers, the Natives of the area held stories of Coyote in their Creation mythology. Coyote held a pivotal role in the change between a world of animals and plants only, to a world where humans roamed as well. "The people of the time, though they had human form, were really animals, gifted with magical powers. Into the world then came certain transformers, the greatest of whom were the Coyote and the Old Man, who put the earth in order, giving the mountains and the valleys their present aspects and transforming the wicked among them, and these were the beings who the ancient world denizens into the animal shapes which are still theirs; the descendants of the good among these pristine beings are the Indians of today"

=== Southwest ===
Coyote also appears in the traditions of the Jicarilla Apache. In the mythology of the Tohono O'odham people of Arizona, he appears as an associate of the culture-hero Montezuma. Coyote also appears as a trickster in stories of the Tohono O'odham people. As told by a collective of natives in O'odham Creation and Related Events- Coyote Marries the Hunter's Wives, Red Racer Snake and Coyote, Turtle and Coyote, and many more stories of Coyote dealing in his usual mix of kind gestures with tricky twists and ulterior motives.

He appears with a pivotal role in the creation myth of the Navajo people of Northern Arizona. "The Navajo people believe the world is built in a sequence of stories, the fifth of these being the earth on which men now dwell. The genesis legend of this tribe divides into four episodic tales: the first of which, The Age of Beginnings, narrates the ascent of the progenitors of Earth's inhabitants from story to story of the Underworld, and their final emergence upon Earth" As the story develops Coyote guides the humans down to earth while badger continues to the underworld. "One day they saw the Sky stooping down and the earth rising to meet it. At the point of contact, Coyote and Badger sprang down from the world above; Badger descended into the world below, but Coyote remained with the people (First Man)."

He also appears in a legend of the White Mountain Apache, "Coyote fights a lump of pitch" (a variant of the Tar-Baby theme), and in similar legends of the Zapotec and Popoluca of Mexico.

Coyote plays a prominent role in many stories in the Diné (Navajo) mythos; see Coyote (Navajo mythology).

== Functional cognates ==
Coyote is compared to both the Scandinavian Loki, and also Prometheus, who shared with Coyote the trick of having stolen fire from the gods as a gift for mankind, and Anansi, a mythological culture hero from Western African mythology. In Eurasia, rather than a coyote, a fox is often featured as a trickster hero, ranging from kitsune (fox) tales in Japan to the Reynard cycle in Western Europe.

Claude Lévi-Strauss, French anthropologist proposed a structuralist theory that suggests that Coyote and Crow obtained mythic status because they are mediator animals between life and death.

== Language revitalization and preservation ==
Coyote figures prominently in a number of Indigenous language and cultural and preservation projects in North America. For example, the Secwepemc people of the Kamloops Indian Band in Kamloops, British Columbia, have named their recently opened elementary school the Sk'elep School of Excellence, while educational websites such as one co-sponsored by the Neskonlith Indian Band of Chase, British Columbia prominently feature stories about Sk'elep.

== See also ==
- Huehuecoyotlh
