= Pedro Moctezuma =

Aztec noble

Don Pedro Moctezuma
- Born: 1510 or 1511
- Died: 1570 (aged 59–60)
- Father: Moctezuma II
- Mother: María Miyahuaxochtzin

Don Pedro (de) Moctezuma Tlacahuepan Yohualicahuaca (1511-1570) was a son of the Aztec emperor Moctezuma II and María Miyahuaxochtzin, the daughter of Ixtlilcuecahuacatzin, ruler of Tollan. He became a nobleman and ruler of the Spanish Empire after the conquest of the Aztecs.

== History ==
Son to Moctezuma II and brother or half-brother to Mariana Leonor Moctezuma and Isabel Moctezuma, he was a child during the siege of Tenochtitlan, where he was hidden by his partisans until the battles ended. Afterwards he was acknowledged by both Mexicas and Spaniards as legitimate successor to Moctezuma. Spain offered Aztec nobles status in the new socio-economic system by assigning encomiendas, labor tributes conveying the aristocrats in Mexico. As a son of the emperor, Pedro Moctezuma inherited noble status in New Spain, receiving his own encomienda in Tollan.

In 1528, now as an adult, he accompanied Hernán Cortés to Spain with a great native entourage to honor King of Spain and Holy Roman Emperor Charles V, after which he returned New Spain in the same fleet as Bernardino de Sahagún. He was made governor of his native city by Sebastián Ramírez de Fuenleal, ruling from 1530 to 1539. During all of this tenure he had a political enmity with fellow Mexica nobleman Francisco Aztlatl, who accused Moctezuma of various crimes, possibly in retaliation for Pedro accusing him of idolatry in a previous occasion. Their quarrel continued for years and caused Moctezuma to be exiled and reinstated multiple times.

Towards the end of 1539, he journeyed to Spain again in the company of other native noblemen, hoping to solve the dispute and separately claim an heritage, which included cacicazgo of Tula. It is believed he also sought a Papal dispensation to be able to marry his cousin Inés Tiacapan, which his sister Isabel opposed by political reasons. In his absence, leaving his mother as a regent, his lands were invaded by Aztlatl's partisans. Although Moctezuma returned with a royal decree ordering to put an end to the conflict, the latter would outlive him after his death in 1570, being inherited by his sons Martín and Diego.

The Counts and later Dukes of Moctezuma de Tultengo are descended from Moctezuma II through Pedro Tlacahuepan and his son Diego Luis Moctezuma (Ihuitl Temoc), who went to Spain. Diego Luis' son, Pedro's grandson, Pedro Tesifón de Moctezuma y de la Cueva was created Count of Moctezuma by Philip IV of Spain in 1628.
