= Isabel de Tolosa Cortés de Moctezuma =

Spanish noble

Doña Isabel de Tolosa Cortés de Moctezuma (1568 – 1619/1620), was a wealthy New Spanish heiress and the wife of conqueror and explorer Don Juan de Oñate who led an expedition in 1598 and founded the first Spanish settlement in what is now the state of New Mexico. She was the granddaughter of Spanish explorer and conquistador Hernán Cortés, and the great-granddaughter of Aztec Emperor Moctezuma II.

== Background and marriage ==
Doña Isabel was a castiza of mixed Spanish (of Basque and Extremaduran ancestry) and Aztec Indian ancestry, born in Mexico City, New Spain in 1568, a daughter of Juan de Tolosa and Leonor Cortés Moctezuma. Her mother was the illegitimate daughter of the Spanish conqueror Hernán Cortés and Tecuichpoch (baptised Isabel), the eldest daughter of Aztec Emperor Moctezuma II.

Isabel's father was a wealthy Basque mine owner who had discovered the silver mines at Zacatecas in 1546. She had a brother, Juan, and several sisters; one of whom was Leonor de Tolosa Cortés de Moctezuma who married Cristobal de Zaldivar, and others who were nuns in Seville, Spain.

In 1588 in Panuco, Zacatecas, Isabel married Don Juan de Oñate, a Spaniard of Basque ancestry and founder of Santa Fe, New Mexico. He led a group of 700 settlers and soldiers in 1598 to settle New Mexico two decades before the Mayflower left the port. His father was a wealthy silver mine owner. This marriage to the wealthy Isabel, gave him much prestige as she was descended from Cortez and Moctezuma. Together they had a son and daughter:

- Cristobal de Naharriondo Perez Oñate y Cortés Moctezuma (c.1589 – 1610), married Maria Gutierrez del Castillo, by whom he had one son, Juan de Onate. From 1608 to 1610, he ruled as the first elected Governor in the New Spain province of Santa Fe de Nuevo México.
- Maria de Oñate y Cortés Moctezuma (born 1590/1594), on 17 August 1616, married her cousin Sergeant Major Vicente de Zaldívar Oñate Mendoza, by whom she had issue.

In 1595, Isabel's husband was ordered by King Philip II of Spain to colonise the upper Rio Grande valley. Isabel remained behind in Zacatecas when her husband led the expedition in 1598 to what is now the state of New Mexico, and founded the first Spanish settlement in the region. Her son, Cristobal, aged about nine, accompanied his father. Her husband claimed all of New Mexico beyond the Rio Grande for Spain, and was the first colonial governor in the New Spain province of Santa Fe de Nuevo México; however, in 1608 their son Cristobal actually became the first elected governor.

Isabel died on an unknown date in about 1619 or 1620 at Panuco, Zacatecas. Her husband died in 1626 in Spain.
