= Repartimiento =

Forced labor in Spanish colonies

The Repartimiento (Spanish pronunciation: [repaɾtiˈmjento]) (Spanish, "distribution, partition, or division") was a colonial labor system imposed upon the Indigenous population of Spanish America and the Philippines. In concept, it was similar to other tribute-labor systems, such as the mit'a of the Inca Empire or the corvée of the Ancien Régime de France: Through the pueblos de indios, the Amerindians were drafted work for cycles of weeks, months, or years, on farms, in mines, in workshops (obrajes), and public projects.

== Establishment of the repartimiento and decline of the encomienda ==
With the New Laws of 1542, the repartimiento was instated to substitute the encomienda system that had come to be seen as abusive and promoting of unethical behavior. The Spanish Crown aimed to remove control of the Indigenous population, now considered subjects of the Crown, from the hands of the encomenderos, who had become a politically influential and wealthy class, with the shift away from both the encomienda system and the enslavement of the native groups.

The repartimiento was not slavery, in that the worker is not owned outright—being free in various respects other than in the dispensation of his or her labor—and the work was intermittent. However, it created slavery-like conditions in certain areas, most notoriously in silver mines of 16th century Peru under the draft labor system known as mita, influenced in part by a similar draft labor system the Inca used also called mit'a. In New Spain, the collapse of Indigenous populations from conquest and disease led to a shift from the encomienda system to pueblos de indios, as the encomienda system no longer made economic sense since there were not enough Amerindians remaining. They needed to consolidate labor, which they did in a process known as reducciones. The encomienda system was replaced by “two parallel yet separate ‘republics’.” The república de españoles "included Spaniards, who lived in Spanish cities and obeyed Spanish law," and the república de indios “included natives, who resided in native communities, where native law and native authorities (as long as they did not contradict Spanish norms) prevailed.” It was in this second domain where the pueblos de indios resided. Amerindians who lived in the pueblos de indios had ownership over their land, but, deemed subjects of the Spanish Crown, they had to pay tribute.

== How it worked ==
In practice, a conquistador, or later a Spanish settler or official, would be given and supervised a number of Indigenous workers, who would labor in farms or mines, or in the case of the Philippines might also be assigned to the ship yards constructing the Manila galleons. This would come from Hispanic miners or agriculturalists putting in a weekly application for labor with the district magistrate or a special judge who is in charge of repartimiento labor. Adult males of the community whose turn it was to go were assembled by the jueces reparations (the Amerindians governors of the pueblos de indios) and given to the Spanish official who would move them to a different area to do whatever labor was needed. Legally, these systems were not allowed to interfere with the Amerindians own survival, with only 7-10% of the adult male population allowed to be assigned at any time. These Amerindians were paid wages for their labor, which they could then use to pay tribute to the Crown.

Native men, working around 3 to 4 weeks a year, could also be put to work by the local government in public works such as harvests, mines, and infrastructure. Mining, specifically, was a concern for the Crown as well as Peruvian viceroy. Enacted by Don Francisco de Toledo, these mining drafts were brought in Indigenous workers through this draft labor system to do backbreaking work. While there were attempts to guard against overwork, abuses of power and high quotas set by mine owners continued, leading to both depopulation and the system of Indigenous men buying themselves out of the labor draft by paying their own curacas or employers.

== Decline of the Repartimiento System in New Spain ==
The diminution of the number of natives in the Americas due to European diseases (smallpox, influenza, measles and typhus) to which the native populations had no resistance, as well as to desertion from the work fields, led to the substitution of the encomienda system and the creation of privately owned farms and haciendas in New Spain. In order to evade these compulsory labor system of encomienda and repartimiento, Amerindians left their pueblos de indios. This was a dangerous venture, as it left them landless and without community. If an Amerindian left their pueblo, they would look for wage labor; others signed contracts (asientos) for six months to a year, during which time the worker was required to be paid a salary, and provided living quarters as well as religious services. In Northern New Spain, this was a frequent occurrence. This area was not greatly populated, and because of this, it was harder for the Spanish to enforce reducciones, meaning they could not create pueblos de indios to pull repartimiento labor from. Northern New Spain had the most silver mines, and because repartimiento labor was unreliable, wage labor was the dominant form of labor used in New Spain. Although not ideal, the Spanish Crown allowed this as silver was their priority for trade with China after the Ming Dynasty made silver the only currency for internal taxation and external trade.

== Capitalist development ==
The repartimiento, for the most part, replaced the encomienda throughout the Viceroyalty of New Spain by the beginning of the 17th century. In Peru, the mita labor system prevailed because the Inca Empire had already established a centralized tribute system, as well as a common identity, and already had experience with a rotational labor system from the Incan mit'a. The decline of rotational draft labor in New Spain paved the way for one of the first capitalist societies in the world as Amerindian laborers who left their pueblos de indios were landless and instead sold their labor to purchase food and housing. Peru did not experience this same development because the Amerindians remained landed for longer, having access to their own means of production.

== See also ==
- Polo y servicio, a similar forced labor system in Spanish-controlled colonial Philippines
- Cargo system
- Encomienda
- Encomiendas in Peru
- Reductions
- Jesuit Reductions
- Genízaros

== Bibliography ==
- Cole, Jeffery A. (1985). The Potosí Mita, 1573-1700: Compulsory Indian Labor in the Andes. Stanford: Stanford University Press. ISBN 0-8047-1256-5
