= Montezuma's revenge (disambiguation) =

Montezuma's revenge is a colloquial term for traveler's diarrhea.

Montezuma's Revenge may also refer to:

- Montezuma's Revenge (video game), a 1984 platform game by Parker Brothers
- Montezuma's Revenge (bicycle race) a mountain bike race in Colorado, US
- Montezooma's Revenge, a roller coaster at Knott's Berry Farm, California, US
- Montezuma's Revenge (album), a 2009 album by Souls of Mischief
- Montezuma's Revenge, a 1972 novel by Harry Harrison
- "Montezuma's Revenge", a song on the 1977 album Tasty by The Shadows
- "Montezuma's Revenge", a track on the 1977 album White Rock by Rick Wakeman

== See also ==
- Montezuma (disambiguation)
