= Montezuma (mythology) =

Heroic-god in the mythology of certain Amerindian tribes of the Southwest United States

Montezuma was the name of a heroic-god in the mythology of certain Amerindian tribes of the Southwest United States, notably the Tohono O'odham and Pueblo peoples.

== Tohono O'odham version ==
In the Tohono O'odham legend, at the beginning of time the Great Spirit finds clay by digging a hole; he then drops the clay into the hole again and out comes Montezuma, who assists him in bringing out all the Indian tribes, with the Apache last of all. It is said that all men and animals were speaking a common language in the early days; however a great flood destroyed everyone, with only Montezuma and his friend, Coyote, escaping. Because Coyote had warned him of the flood beforehand, Montezuma had fashioned a boat that he kept prepared on the peak of the Santa Rosa Mountains in Arizona. Coyote likewise made a boat for himself, by gnawing down a giant cane and stopping it with gum.

After the flood had subsided, Montezuma and Coyote meet again atop Monte Rosa, and Montezuma sends Coyote out four times, once in each direction, to find out how far the sea is. He quickly returned from the south and the west, reporting that it was nearby. The journey east took a bit longer, but eventually he found the sea there also. Finally, he journeys northward and never finds water before growing tired.

Meanwhile, the Great Spirit, helped by Montezuma, has again repopulated the world with people and animals. Montezuma is entrusted with the governance of mankind, but becoming proud and wicked, he rebels against the Great Spirit, dismisses Coyote, and commands mankind to build a house tall enough to reach Heaven. Before he can succeed at this endeavour, the Great Spirit casts it down with thunderbolts, causing a confusion in the languages of mankind.

Persisting in his wickedness, Montezuma commands all the temples be destroyed; in response, the Great Spirit punishes him by sending a locust to the east to summon the Spanish, who make war on Montezuma and destroy him.

This legend was related by chief Con Quien of the Tohono O'odham and published in the Indian Affairs Report of 1865, p. 131. Bancroft, writing later in the 19th century (Native Races vol 3), speculates that the name of the historical Aztec Emperors, Moctezuma (more properly Motecuhzoma in Nahuatl), was the ultimate origin of the mythical hero-god's name — the name being "gradually associated in the minds of some of the New Mexican and neighboring tribes, with a vague, mythical, and departed grandeur", until "all the lesser heroes would be gradually absorbed in the greater, and their names forgotten. Their deeds would become his deeds, their fame his fame."

The authenticity of this legend, however, is questionable, due to Spanish evangelization among the tribes. The legend listed above of the Southwestern tribes of North America share a correlating theme as the biblical story of the “Tower of Babel”. Thus, religious syncretism is a probable explanation for this.

However, other references among the Arizona and New Mexico tribes indicate a belief in "Montezuma" as having been the name of a great king and law-giver of the remote past, who ruled over a vast empire including Mexico, and who is said to be buried inside a particular mountain in Arizona that allegedly bears his image.

In 1737, the religious prophet Agustín Ascuchul appeared among the Guaima and Pima Indians (Akimel O'odham), close relatives of the Tohono O'odham, and claimed that the god Moctezuma had appeared to him and named him his prophet. He called on the Indians to follow him to a new place to worship the god. More than 5,000 Indians abandoned their homes to follow him. The governor of Sonora, Juan Bautista de Anza, interpreted this as a rebellion, suppressed it, and hanged Ascuchul.

== Pueblo version ==
Montezuma also figures prominently in the religion of the Pueblo, who held that their god-king Montezuma was variously from Taos, Acoma, or one of the other pueblos, and was conceived from a beautiful virgin and a pinyon pine nut. Although weak as a youth, he was chosen to be their unlikely leader, and surprised everyone with his miracles, including the ability to produce rain. He taught the people their customs, and how to build the adobe pueblos. One day he kindled a fire that they were never to allow to burn out, then departed for Mexico (in some versions, on the back of an eagle), promising to return some day and save them from the Spanish.

U.S. Attorney W.W.H. Davis, who visited the Laguna Pueblo in 1855, was allowed a rare glimpse at some sort of idol or icon of their god Montezuma, whereof he gave a vivid description in his book El Gringo. According to Davis, this object was round, nine inches tall and in diameter, and made of tanned skin. The cover was painted half red and half green, and on the green side were triangular holes for eyes, round pieces of leather for the mouth and ears, and no nose. He said it was kept wrapped in cloth, and was sprinkled with a 'white powder'.

The Swiss-American ethnographer Adolph Bandelier asserted in the 1890s that these legends had been invented by the Pueblos fifty years earlier solely to impress American explorers, and were not really part of their religion; he cited a document purporting to be a secret plot to 'teach' the natives that they were the descendants of Emperor Montezuma for political purposes, during the Mexican–American War. However, other documents have since come to light showing that the Spanish too were quite aware of Montezuma's renown in the Pueblo region long before then—the earliest such recorded reference dating to 1694, when the natives told Jesuit Father Eusebio Francisco Kino that Montezuma had built what is today known as Casa Grande (Wilson 1999, p. 16).

Finally, Llewellyn Harris, a Welsh-American Mormon missionary who visited the Zuni in 1878, claimed that they told him they were descended from Montezuma. Montezuma himself was said to have descended from white men called "Cambaraga", who came from over the sea 300 years before the Spanish. Harris claims that the Zuni had many Welsh words in their language, and theorised that the "Cambaraga" could potentially be connected to the Welsh Madoc folklore.
