= Encomiendas in Peru =

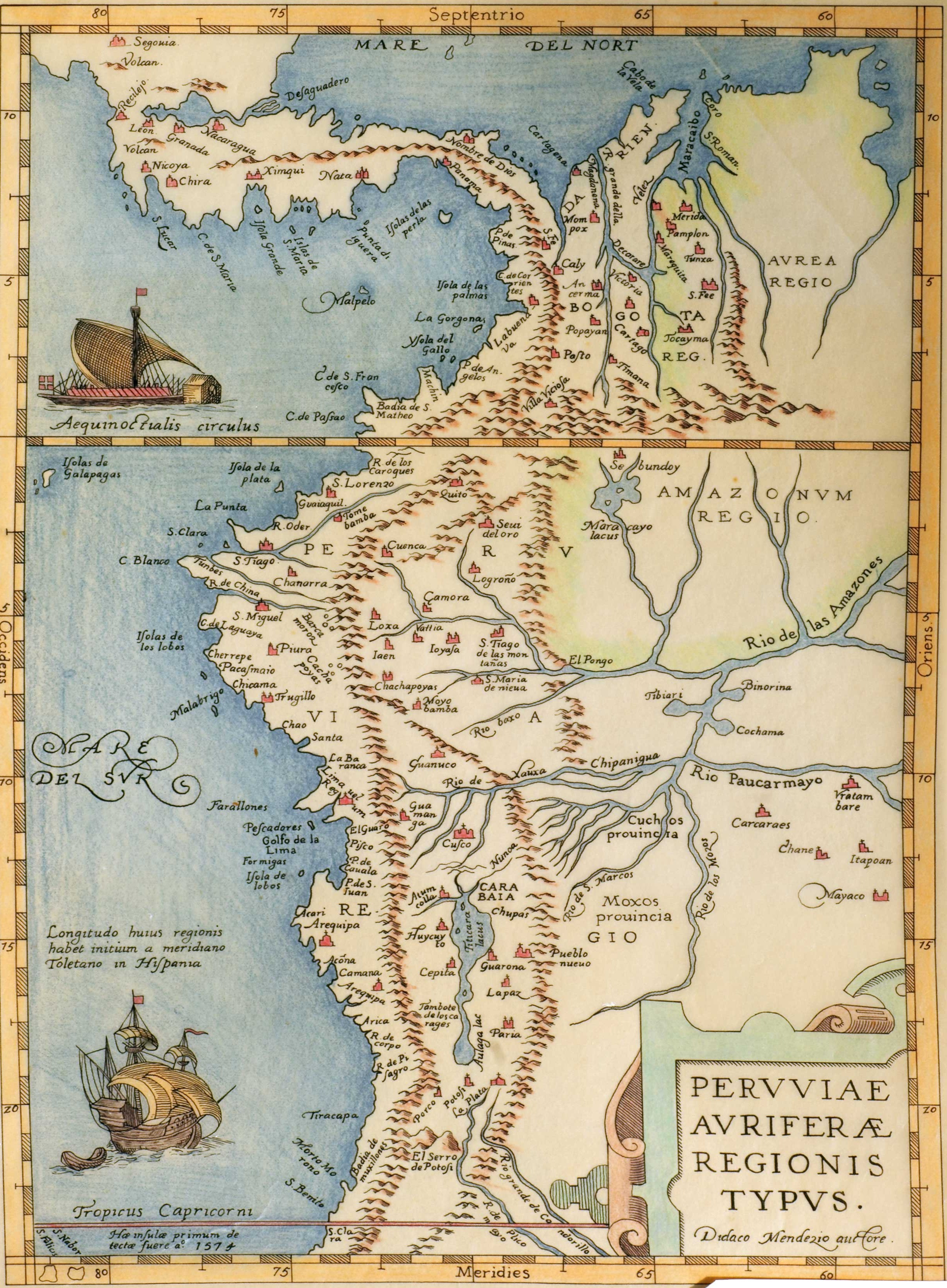
Peru in 1574 from Quito (now Ecuador) in the north to Potosí (now Bolivia) in the south.

An encomienda in Peru was a reward offered to each of the men under the leadership of Francisco Pizarro who began the Spanish conquest of the Inca Empire in 1532. In the early colonial period of the New World, land had little economic value without labor to exploit it. The grant of an encomienda bestowed an encomendero the right to collect tribute from a community of indigenous people. The word encomienda means "trust", indicating that the indigenous people were entrusted to the care and attention of an encomendero. In reality, the encomienda system is often compared to slavery. Theoretically, the encomendero grantee did not own the people or the land occupied by his subjects, but only the right to tribute, usually in the form of labor, that he could extract from them.

Grants of encomiendas were later extended to both soldiers and non-soldiers who provided valuable services to the conquest and settlement of Peru. The governor of Peru, initially Pizarro and later the viceroy, granted encomiendas to individuals. The grant of an encomienda to an individual was intended to be inheritable only to a second generation. The encomendero was responsible for paying a tax to the King of Spain; to protect and provide religious education to the indigenous people, henceforth called "Andeans," under his control; to provide military services as needed; and to maintain a residence near the area in which his subjects lived.

Encomiendas varied in size and wealth, with the Pizarros and other military leaders receiving much larger and richer grants than the rank and file among their soldiers. However, even the most humble members of the conquering army acquired wealth and social status far beyond what they could have hoped for in Spain or in other Spanish colonies. Part of the wealth came immediately from the soldiers' share of the treasure captured from the Incas and part came more slowly from the labor of the people living in the encomiendas that those soldiers controlled. Most of the wealth derived from encomiendas was from agriculture or mining, although manufacturing, especially of textiles, was a source of income of some encomiendas.

The encomienda "was the key institution of early Spanish colonialism" and the principal means of exploiting the labor of the Andeans by the Spanish conquerors. The grant of an encomienda enabled the recipient to enjoy a "lordly rank and life-style" and encomenderos, often of humble origins, dominated local governments and were economically important. The number of encomiendas in Peru peaked around 1570. In most of Latin America, the encomienda system gave way to repartimiento in the late 16th century; in Peru, encomiendas persisted until the 18th century. In 1721, the creation of new encomiendas was prohibited by the Spanish Crown. The encomiendas were gradually replaced by large, landed estates called haciendas in which, unlike the encomienda, the hacendado or patron was the legal owner of the land.

== Spoils of war ==
During the centuries-long reconquest of Spain, Spanish Christian leaders awarded encomiendas to individuals for their military services in gaining control of territory and people ruled by the Muslims. The institution was carried to the New World. In Peru, the first encomenderos were 40 aged and injured Spanish soldiers who Pizzaro left as a rear guard in the town of Piura as he led his main force inland to confront the Inca Empire in 1532. Each of Pizarro's force of 168 men who participated in the Battle of Cajamarca was entitled to an encomienda. Most of them were from the humbler social classes of Spain. Shortly after Cajamarca, Pizarro was joined by Diego de Almagro with 200 additional men and the Spaniards continued the conquest by capturing Cuzco and establishing a Spanish city there in 1534. Almagro and his men were the last Spaniards in Peru who were automatically entitled to an encomienda, although many soldiers who arrived later were also recipients. The military leaders awarded themselves the most valuable of the encomiendas. The governor of Peru (initially Pizzaro himself) and the captains of the conquering armies had the authority to grant encomiendas, although the encomendero was required to pay taxes to the Crown of Spain.

In the late 1530s and 1540s, when Peru was impacted by civil war, encomiendas were given to (or taken away from) captains and cavalrymen but not usually common soldiers. By 1560, those given or retaining encomiendas were soldiers from the days of the conquest, elites of Spanish society, military leaders of distinction during the civil wars, and people with good connections. A few of the people granted encomiendas chose to return to Spain and gave up or illegally sold their encomienda. Others who remained in Peru maneuvered to retain the encomienda for their descendants.

In 1570, the number of encomiendas in Peru (which included Ecuador, Bolivia, and northern Chile at that time) peaked at about 470 and the encomenderos reached the apogee of their economic and political importance. In 1550 the average number of "tributaries" (native males between 15 and 50 years of age) assigned to each encomienda was 673. Counting family members, the number of Andean people subject to an encomendero totaled more than one million. By 1630, the number of encomiendas had declined to slightly more than 300, of which about 70 were within 21st-century Ecuador and 30 in Bolivia. Part of the reason for the decline was the simultaneous decline in the Andean population, mostly due to epidemics of diseases introduced by European colonists, but also the exploitation of the native peoples. Scholars estimate the indigenous population of Peru (not including modern-day Ecuador and Bolivia in this estimate) at 600,000 in 1620 compared to a population of approximately nine million in pre-Columbian Peru. The number of Europeans, mostly Spanish, living in Peru in 1630 was about 34,000.

The persistence of encomiendas in Peru, long after the system had been replaced in most of Latin America, was due to the cultural similarity between the Spanish encomienda and the Inca system of tribute labor, the mit'a. The Spanish inherited and adapted the mit'a system. Although the Incan mit'a does not appear to have been as exploitative as the Spanish encomienda, both were systems of corvée or forced labor in which the Andeans worked for the benefit of an overlord.

== Encomenderos ==
The ideal life of an encomendero was a "casa poblada" (populated house), a Spanish concept which "implied a large house, a Spanish wife if possible, a table where many guests were maintained, African slaves, a staff of Spanish and Indian [Indigenous people] servant-employees" plus "a stable of horses, fine clothing, ownership of agricultural land and herds of livestock, and holding office on the municipal councils." The encomenderos derived most of their income from agriculture and mining, although they might also invest in commerce and real estate. By 1540, as the numbers of Spaniards in Peru increased, nearly all encomenderos hired one or more majordomos to manage their enterprises. Majordomos or stewards were usually of modest origin, but had to be literate and they were usually paid a percentage of the profits of the encomienda, most commonly about 20 percent. The majordomos were usually more instrumental in managing the encomienda than the encomendero himself. The encomendero often lived far from his encomienda in a city, most commonly Lima, Cusco, or Quito (a few lived in Spain), and only visited his encomienda occasionally. Also hired by most encomenderos were "estancieros": Spaniards, Portuguese, or Canary Islanders of modest heritage and low prestige who lived among the Andeans and were usually herders and farmers. Mining was often a lucrative business for encomenderos and they hired skilled professionals to manage gold and silver mines. Their managers received a share of up to 20 percent of the profits of mines and smelters.

=== Women (encomenderas) ===
Spanish men far outnumbered Spanish women in 16th century Peru. If an encomendero wished to pass on his encomienda to his heir, he must have a legal wife and an heir born in wedlock, so almost all encomenderos married Spanish women—or at least women with a claim to be Spanish. The wives of encomenderos in the 16th century occupied the highest rung of female society in Peru and between 1534 and 1620 at least 102 widows and daughters of encomenderos became encomenderas, the possessor, usually temporary pending marriage or re-marriage, of an encomienda. By custom, widows were required to marry soon after the death of a husband and, given the high mortality of men in the turbulent Peru in the early decades of its colonial existence, many women were married three or four times and effectively managed the encomiendas of their dead husbands. The encomenderas of those days have been described as mostly of plebeian birth with only a few aristocrats among them, but even encomenderas of modest heritage possessed far greater luxuries than women of similar heritage had in Spain. In exceptional circumstances, a woman might be granted an encomienda on her own merit. In the 1540s, Maria Escobar, twice-widowed and heir to two encomiendas, was awarded one of her own when she grew wheat and introduced wheaten bread to Lima, which until then had depended upon maize for bread. Another twice-widowed encomendera, Jordana Mejía, who died in 1624, acquired so much wealth that the will allocating her assets ran to more than 250 pages.

== Andeans ("Indios") ==
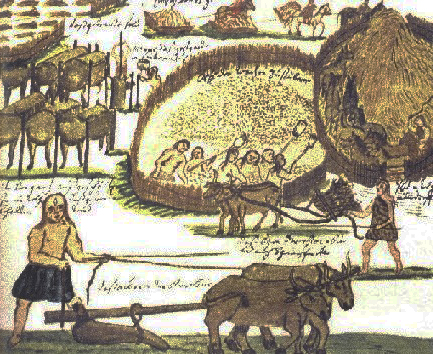
Indigenous people working on an encomienda in the 18th century.

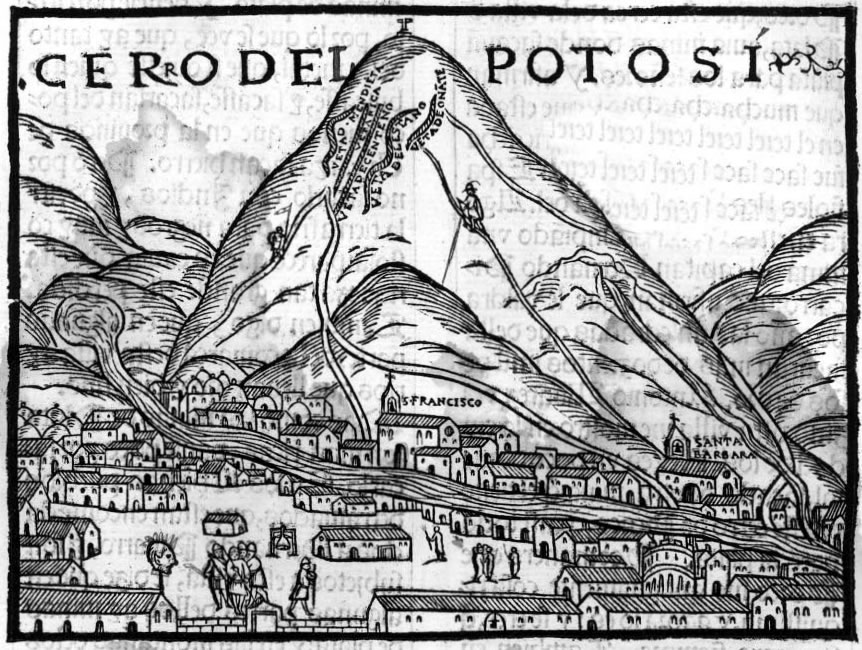
The silver mountain and city of Potosí in 1553.

Encomenderos had little contact with the Andean people whose labor they controlled other than their house servants. Instead, indigenous leaders, called caciques (kurakas in Quechua) by the Spanish, were the intermediaries between the encomendero and his subjects. Lineages of the caciques often predated the Spanish, and even the Incas. They were the "preexisting, functioning machinery of local government." The encomendero might attempt to extract more income from his encomienda "but he had no interest in dismantling" the system he inherited from the Incas. It was the caciques who controlled the Andean people of the encomienda and delivered tribute and labor to the encomendero. The caciques were widely accused of being corrupt and cruel to the people under their control, but they were essential to the encomenderos. Caciques even occupied a high position in the complicated status pyramid of the Spaniards, entitled to be called "don" as some encomenderos, and many of their wives, were not dons or doñas. Caciques had a very substantial income.

The Andean people subject to the direct rule of the caciques and the indirect rule of the encomenderos were a declining and demoralized group. They were beset by recurring epidemics of European diseases that drastically reduced their population. They were subjected to exorbitant demands for tribute and labor by the Spanish. They were killed or died in large numbers in the civil wars and indigenous revolts that broke out during the first 40 years after the initial conquest. The Spanish "demand[ed] gold and silver from those who have no mines ... pigs from those who do not raise them ... [and] maize, wheat and aji [peppers] from those who do not raise them." Moreover, the Andean subjects had to deliver the tribute demanded by the encomendero to his home which could be up to 300 kilometres (190 miles) distant from their homes. Transporting their tribute, mostly agricultural products, on their backs or in llama caravans might take months every year. In return, the encomenderos provided priests for the instruction of the Andeans "in the tenets of our Holy Catholic Faith."

Most of the Andean people of the encomiendas worked near their homes but many were drafted for work at distant locations in mines and textile manufacture. Beginning in the 1570s, the male labor force south of Cuzco, including that of the encomiendas, was required to travel and work in the silver mines in Potosí. One-seventh of the labor force, about 13,500 men, worked alternating six-month shifts in Potosí. Additional levies of Andean labor were made for notoriously-unhealthy work in the mercury mine at Huancavelica and in manufacturing textiles in northern Peru. The small wages they earned for difficult and dangerous work helped them pay the annual cash tribute they owed to the encomenderos.

== Slavery and the encomienda ==
The Andeans working Peruvian encomiendas are sometimes characterized as slaves, but the encomenderos were given rights only to the labor of the natives, not their land. The Andean could not be sold or relocated by the encomendero. Nor did the encomendero own his encomienda in perpetuity. Inheritance was limited to only one generation after the grant of the encomienda to an individual. However, proponents of encomiendas made the argument that the restrictions on inheritance caused the encomendero to exploit and take less care of his workers than if they had been his property, i.e. inheritable slaves. Although the legal restrictions on the encomenderos were often violated, the status of the workers on the encomiendas was forced labor.

Many encomenderos owned slaves of African and native American origin. The native American slaves were non-Andeans, imported from Nicaragua and Venezuela, relatively few in number and absorbed into the general population of Peru after enslavement of indigenous people in the Americas was outlawed by Spain in the 1540s. Most of the native slaves of the encomenderos were women who were concubines or house servants. African slaves were more numerous. In 1542 an encomendero in Cusco bought 17 African slaves to work in a gold mine, but most African slaves in mid-16th century Peru became servants of the rich, including the encomenderos. They were trusted because they were isolated from the general population and dependent upon their owners. The possession of one or more African slaves was a mark of prestige for an encomendero in his pursuit of the ideal of the casa poblada, the "peopled house" of the encomendero, his family, relatives, and servants).

== Decline ==
The conquest of Peru came at little cost to the finances of the Crown of Spain, but the power of the encomenderos was perceived as a threat. In 1542, King Charles V expressed that concern by adopting the New Laws which abolished slavery and the encomienda system in the Spanish colonies of the New World. The encomenderos in Peru revolted, killed the first viceroy to Peru, and forced the Crown to revoke the law. The Crown and some religious leaders had concern for the welfare of the Andean people, but that concern conflicted with the Crown's need for revenue from Peru of which the taxes paid by the encomenderos were the largest part in the early days of the colony.

In 1554 the encomenderos of Peru sent a representative, Antonio de Ribera, to Spain with an extraordinary offer for the King of Spain. The encomenderos offered a cash payment of 7.6 million pesos to the debt-burdened Crown, twice the amount of the Spanish national debt. In exchange they wanted two things: perpetuity, the right to pass along their encomienda to their heirs indefinitely, and control of their indigenous subjects with the authority to appoint judges, thus bypassing the authority of the caciques and Spanish officials in Peru. The caciques assisted by Roman Catholic clerics, both threatened by the proposal, also sent a representative to Spain, the son of Geronimo Guacrapaucar, a cacique of Jauja who had survived since Inca times, with their counter offer: 100,000 pesos more than the encomendero's offer in exchange for proclaiming the caciques the lords of Peru and eliminating encomiendas. It is doubtful that either side had the resources to back up their offer, and neither was accepted. In the 1560s, the encomenderos suppressed the caciques in Jauja, alleging that they were planning a revolt.

The response from the Crown was unfavorable to both sides. The acting Viceroy of Peru, Lope García de Castro, created the office of "Corregidor de Indios," which extended the power of the Crown into rural areas of Peru. The action united all factions against Garcia and limited the effectiveness of the corregidors, but also destroyed the aspirations of both the encomenderos and the caciques for control of rural Peru. In 1569, with the appointment of Francisco de Toledo as Viceroy and his policy of reductions (concentrating the indigenous people of Peru into Spanish-style villages to facilitate Spanish government control and Christianization), the aspirations of encomenderos and caciques received another blow. With the slow, controversial implementation of reductions, the tribute the encomenderos received from the Andeans went instead to the colonial government, and they received only a portion of it, although many of them were able to convert themselves into landowners. Conversely, the caciques, contrary to Toledo's objective of reducing their influence, became even more important as intermediaries between the colonial government and the Andeans.

In the 17th century, encomenderos retained some of their prestige, but steadily lost their economic importance due to the diversification of the Peruvian economy and declines in the Andean population of Peru. In 1721 the Spanish Crown declared the creation of new encomiendas illegal. The number of encomiendas had declined to about 100 by that time but they continued to exist in some areas of Peru until the late 18th century. Encomiendas were replaced by the hacienda system.

== See also ==
- Spanish conquest of the Inca Empire
