= Gregorio de San Juan =

Gregorio de San Juan was a náhuatl cacique active from the end of the 16th century and the beginning of the 17th. He wrote a testimony that talks about the system of encomiendas established during the Viceroyalty in Mexico in the 16th century.

The system of encomiendas was one of the most important factors in the process of colonisation. In the testament written by Gregorio de San Juan the encomiendas are described as a tool that helped pre-hispanic rulers of Mexico conserve some governmental and administrative faculties. By means of these encomiendas Gregorio de San Juan was able to accumulate a fortune and material goods.

At the end of the 16th century the working laws changed, leaving the system of encomiendas behind and opening the way for the salary.
