= Halls of Montezuma =

Halls of Montezuma may refer to:

- Chapultepec, a hill settled by the Aztecs near Tenochtitlan; now a park in Mexico City
- Chapultepec Castle, a Spanish structure located on Chapultepec hill
- "Marines' Hymn", the official hymn of the United States Marine Corps, which starts "From the halls of Montezuma"
- Halls of Montezuma (film), a 1951 film
- Halls of Montezuma: A Battle History of the U.S. Marine Corps, a 1990 video game
