= USS Montezuma =

USS Montezuma may refer to the following vessels of the United States Navy:

- USS Montezuma (1798), was a 20‑gun converted merchant ship acquired by the US Navy in June 1798 and sold December 1799
- USS Montezuma was a vessel launched in 1822 in Philadelphia that from 1822 to 1841 sailed as a packet ship between Philadelphia and Liverpool, England, then became a whaler out of New London, Connecticut that made six whaling voyages between 1841 and 1861, and that the US Navy purchased in November 1861 to be sunk as part of the second stone fleet in April 1862
- USS Montezuma (YTB-145), was a harbor tug that served from 1941 to 1975
