= Luis Marin (conquistador) =

Spanish conquistador (c.1499–c.1547)

- Born: circa 1499; Sanlúcar de Barrameda, Cádiz
- Died: circa 1547; Michoacan, New Spain
- Occupation: Conquistador
- Years active: 1519-1531
- Employer: Spanish Crown
- Known for: Conquistadors Captain with engagements in the southern Veracruz, Tabasco, Chiapas, Oaxaca, northern Guatemala and northern Honduran (Hibueras) regions
- Notable work: Fall of Tenochtitlan, conquest of Tabasco and Chiapas, Execution of Cuauhtemoc, Hibueras campaign
- Title: Captain, Mayor of Mexico City, Councilman
- Spouse: Maria de Mendoza Arellano
- Children: five sons: Geronimo Marin de Mendoza, Alonso Marin de Mendoza, Juan Marin de Mendoza, Ruy Diaz Marin de Mendoza and Francisco Marin de Mendoza one daughter: Marina Mendoza de Marin five children: unknown
- Parents: Francesco Marini (father); Marina Bernal Guillen (mother)
- Family: Jeronimo Marin (brother)

Luis Marin (Spanish: Luis Marín) was a Spanish conquistador who served first under Captain Francisco de Saucedo then later directly under Captain General Hernán Cortés himself during several military campaigns in New Spain including the fall of Tenochtitlan, the Hibueras campaign and many other deployments along southeastern Mexico, Guatemala and Honduras. He is known as the captain who lead many Conquistadors including famous Conquistador and memoir-writer Bernal Díaz del Castillo into several military campaigns to conquer or reconquer sections in southeastern Mexico. Marin would become a close friend and confidant of Cortés serving him from 1519 until 1531, the year after Cortes returned from Spain.

== Biography ==
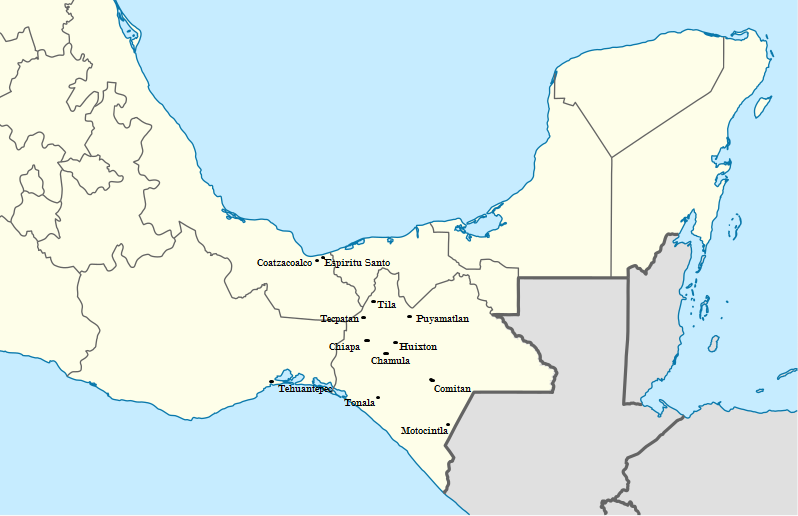
Cities in SE Mexico circa 1500s

Luis Marin was born about 1499 in Sanlúcar de Barrameda, Cádiz in the Andalucian region of Spain. His mother, Maria Bernal Guillen, was also born in Sanlúcar de Barrameda while his father, Francisco Marin (known in Italy as Francesco Maríni), was from a noble, banking family from the Genova, Italy region. Marin married Maria de Mendoza, who herself was related to the second wife of Hernán Cortés. Marin had eleven children. Marin, according to the Bernal Diaz del Castillo's memoir, was a kind-heart gentleman even during military excursions where captured enemies would often be taken as slaves. Marin generally refused and returned custody of prisoners (including women and children) to the locals in attempt to peacefully resolve conflicts.

== Spanish Conquests in Mexico ==
Marin arrived in the coastal city of Veracruz in late July 1519 at the age of 20 from Cuba with Francisco de Saucedo (known as El Pulido) after Hernán Cortés had arrived and began his campaigns against the Natives and had captured Veracruz earlier that month. After the death of Francisco de Saucedo during the retreat of the Battle of Tenochtitlan in 1520, Marín would engage in several campaigns ordered directly from Cortes himself including the fall of Tenochtitlan, the Hibueras campaign in Guatemala and Honduras as well as the conquests of Chiapas in mid 1523 and Tabasco in early 1524. As noted in Bernal Diaz del Castillo's memoir, on direct orders from Cortes, Marin would often travel the mountainous regions of Chiapas and Tabasco to quell Native American rebellions, many times engaging the enemy himself, if necessary, and being severely wounded on a few occasions. In Diaz del Castillo's memoir, Marin and his forces would travel to Guacasualco, Citla, Tabasco, Cimatlan and Chontalpa stretching deep into the deep forested southern regions and marshland northern regions of the Isthmus of Tehuantepec and as far east as Quetzaltenango in northwest Guatemala and Tegucigalpa in Honduras. The control of the Isthmus of Tehuantepec later became a strategic possession as it granted the Spanish Crown the ability to traverse the shortest route across land to the Pacific Ocean.

== Las Hibueras (Honduran Atlantic Coast) ==
On October 12, 1524, Luis Marin accompanied Hernán Cortés to the Hibueras (the Atlantic coastal district of current Honduras). Hernán Cortés was en route to the Hibueras to defeat Captain Cristóbal de Olid who had rebelled against his authority and claimed Honduras for himself, naming himself Governor of Honduras (with the influence of the Governor of Cuba, Diego Velázquez). Cortes asked many of the original Conquistadors to follow him in this trek and also brought La Malinche and Cuauhtemoc along this trek fearing they would start a rebellion in his absence. Aberrant about this betrayal from Olid, Cortes executed Cuauhtemoc in Yaxzam (disputed) on February 28, 1525. After an over year-long conflict, Cortes defeated Olid. He then ordered Marin to return to Mexico. Marin returned to Guacasualco in late 1526 with D. Pedro de Alvarado.

== Failing to conquer Chiapas and asking Cortes for reinforcements ==
He returned to Guacasualco, Veracruz, Mexico and gathered forces to begin an attack in Chiapas. This expedition included now Captain Bernal Diaz de Castillo, Francisco Martin (Calvery Master), Francisco Ximenez, Rodrigo de Henao and four Native Americans from Guacasualco (now Coatzacoalcos, Veracruz) were sent to quell a rebellion and restore order in early 1527. They were attacked by the Natives at Cimatlan taking casualties. Marin presumed all dead but Bernal Diaz del Castillo and Francisco Martin later returned to Guacasualco. These accounts were written by Bernal Diaz del Castillo himself in his well-known memoir "The True History of the Conquest of New Spain" in which his accounts of this campaign is referenced in detail. After meeting with Cortes, he was granted reinforcements and was able to quell the rebellions in Chiapas and Tabasco.

== Later life ==
Marin moved back to Mexico City (Tenochtitlan) in 1531. He met and married his wife Maria de Mendoza Arellano who herself was related to Hernán Cortés' second wife. He had eleven children with Maria de Mendoza. In 1539, he was appointed mayor of Mexico City. A year later, he relinquished this position and became Councilman of Mexico City. He continued to receive a stipend of 1,000 gold pesos annually (about 3.383g of gold per peso (coin) which is about US$152,269 in 2019) for his service to the Spanish Crown. He died of unknown causes in 1547 at age 48.

== Jeronimo Marin ==
His brother, Jeronimo Marin, died en route to the New world.
