= Leonor Cortés Moctezuma =

Aztec noble

Doña Leonor Cortés Moctezuma
- Born: c. 1528
- Died: before 1594 (aged 65–66)
- Spouse: Juan de Tolosa
- Issue: Juan de Tolosa Cortés de Moctezuma; Leonor de Tolosa Cortés Moctezuma; Isabel de Tolosa Cortés de Moctezuma
- Father: Hernán Cortés
- Mother: Isabel Moctezuma
- Citizenship: Spanish
- Relatives: Juan de Oñate (son-in-law)

Doña Leonor Cortés Moctezuma (c. 1528 – before 1594) was the out-of-wedlock daughter of Hernán Cortés, conquistador of Mexico, and Doña Isabel Moctezuma, the eldest daughter of the Aztec Emperor Moctezuma II. She was acknowledged by her father and married Juan de Tolosa, one of the discoverers of the silver mines in Zacatecas.

== Background ==
Doña Isabel Moctezuma was married and widowed four times by the time she was 17 or 18 years old. With the death of her fourth husband in 1527, Cortés, the ruler of New Spain moved her into his palace and, shortly, she became pregnant with her first child. The relationship between Cortés and Doña Isabel was not a happy one and he married the pregnant Doña Isabel to a subordinate, Pedro Gallego de Andrade. Four or five months later in 1528 Doña Leonor was born. Doña Leonor was separated from her mother and raised in the household of Juan Gutiérrez de Altamirano. Cortés, however, acknowledged Doña Leonor as his daughter and ensured that her life would be comfortable.

== Marriage and family ==
Doña Leonor, bearing the two most prestigious surnames in Mexico, became extremely wealthy. Her father, Hernán Cortés, died in 1547 in Spain, leaving her 10,000 ducats and her mother Doña Isabel Moctezuma gave her part of her estate, apparently reconciled with her out-of-wedlock daughter. She accepted marriage with Juan de Tolosa, one of the discoverers of the silver mines and founders of the city of Zacatecas in 1546. With her half brother, Luis Cortés, she traveled from Mexico City to Zacatecas in 1550 to be married. The colonial aristocracy of Zacatecas was a close knit community of Basques intermarried with Spanish and Aztec aristocracy.
The couple had at least three children :

- Juan de Tolosa Cortés de Moctezuma, born in the 1550s, became a priest and Vicar of Zacatecas.
- Leonor de Tolosa Cortés Moctezuma, also born in the 1550s, married into another of the Basque founding families of Zacatecas. Her husband was Cristóbal de Zaldivar Mendoza, son of Vicente de Zaldívar, who was a lieutenant captain general.
- Isabel de Tolosa Cortés Moctezuma, born about 1568, married Juan de Oñate who founded the Spanish colony of New Mexico in 1598.
- Other daughters, names unknown, are mentioned in the records as being in a convent in Seville in 1604.

== Death ==
The date of Doña Leonor's death is unknown, although apparently she died before 1594, as did her husband.

== Bibliography ==
- Chipman, Donald E. (2005). Moctezuma's Children: Aztec Royalty Under Spanish Rule, 1520–1700. Austin, TX: University of Texas Press. ISBN 9780292706286.
- Quijada Cornish, Beatrice (1917). The Ancestry and Family of Juan de Oñate. New York, NY: Macmillan. OCLC 1039493975. OL 13992922M.
- Sagaón Infante, Raquel (1998). "Testamento de Isabel Moctezuma" [Will of Isabel Moctezuma]. Anuario Mexicano de Historia del Derecho (in Spanish). 10. Ciudad Universitaria, Coyoacán, Mexico City, MX: Universidad Nacional Autónoma de México: 753–760.
