= Isabel Moctezuma =

Huey Cihuātlahtoāni of the Aztec Empire

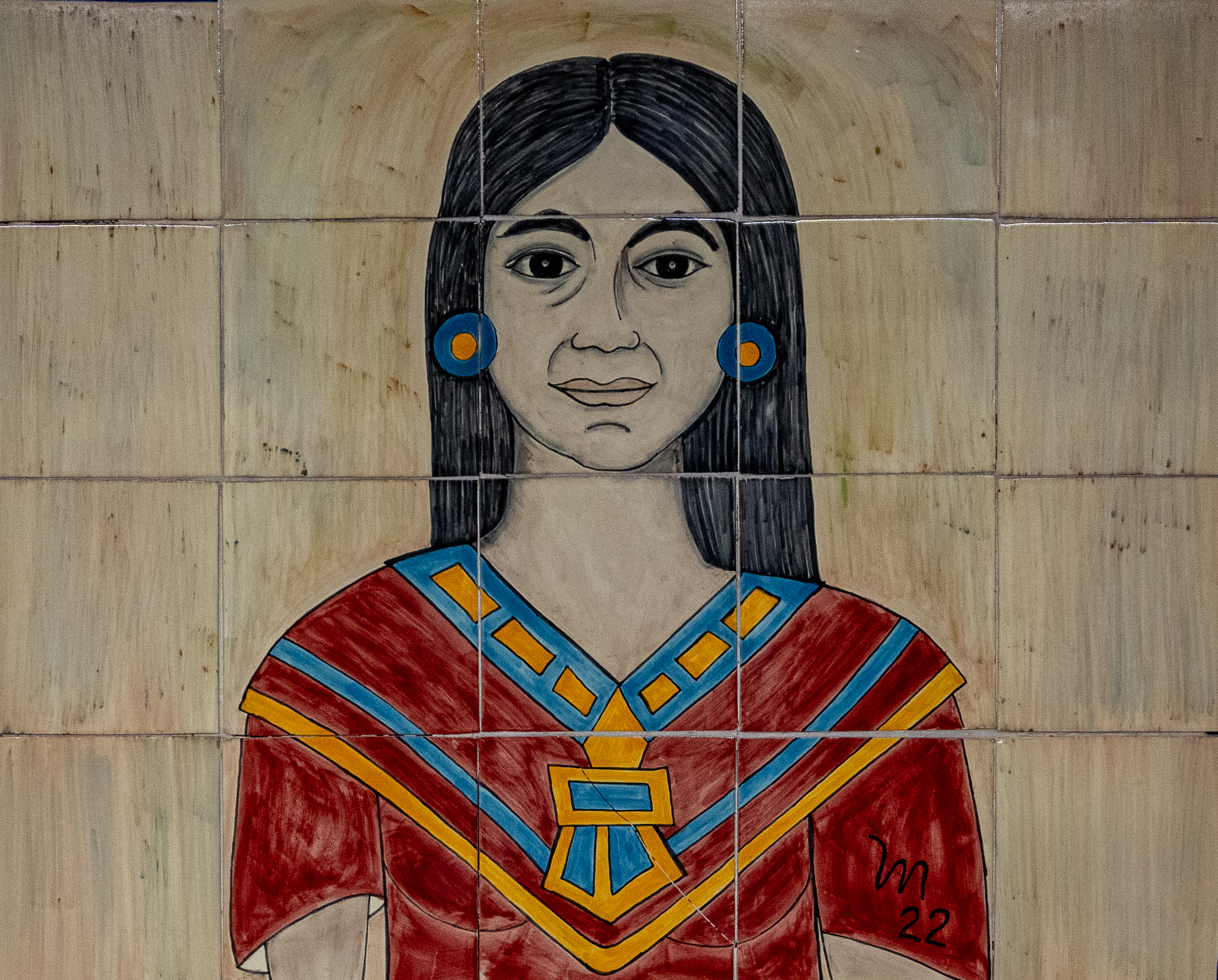
- Artistic interpretation of Isabel Moctezuma at the time of conquest.

Huey Cihuātlahtoāni of the Aztec Empire
- Tenure: 1520–1521
- Huey Tlatoani: Cuitláhuac; Cuauhtémoc
- Born: Tecuichpo Ichcaxochitzin c. 1510
- Died: c. 1551 (aged 41)
- Spouse: Atlixcatzin; Cuitláhuac; Cuauhtémoc; Alonso de Grado; Pedro Gallego de Andrade; Juan Cano de Saavedra
- Issue: Leonor Cortés Moctezuma (illegitimate, father: Hernán Cortés); Juan de Andrade Gallego Moctezuma; Pedro Cano de Moctezuma; Gonzalo Cano de Moctezuma; Juan Cano de Moctezuma; Isabel Cano de Moctezuma; Catalina Cano de Moctezuma
- Father: Moctezuma II
- Mother: Teotlalco

Doña Isabel Moctezuma (born Tecuichpoch Ichcaxochitzin; 1509/1510 – 1550/1551) was a daughter of the Aztec ruler Moctezuma II. She was the consort of Atlixcatzin, a tlacateccatl, and of the Aztec emperors Cuitlahuac and Cuauhtemoc and as such the last Aztec empress. After the Spanish conquest, Doña Isabel was recognized as Moctezuma's legitimate heir, and became one of the Indigenous Mexicans granted an encomienda. Among the others were her half-sister Marina (or Leonor) Moctezuma, and Juan Sánchez, an Indian governor in Oaxaca.

Isabel was married to one tlacateccatl, two Aztec emperors and three Spaniards, and widowed five times. She had a daughter out of wedlock whom she refused to recognize, Leonor Cortés Moctezuma, with conquistador Hernán Cortés. Her sons founded a line of Spanish nobility. The title of Duke of Moctezuma de Tultengo descends from her brother, and still exists.

== Biography ==
=== Family and early marriages ===
Doña Isabel's mother was Princess Teotlalco and her birth name was Tecuich(po)tzin, translated as "lord's daughter" in Nahuatl. Teotlalco was Moctezuma's principal wife and, thus, among Moctezuma's daughters Tecuichpotzin had primacy. As a small child, Tecuichpotzin was married to Atlixcatzin, who died by 1520. After her father was killed, either by his own people or the Spanish, she was quickly married to her uncle Cuitláhuac who became emperor after Moctezuma's death. Cuitláhuac died of smallpox after only 80 days of rule. Cuauhtémoc became emperor and married Tecuichpotzin. She was only about eleven or twelve years old at the time of her third marriage.

=== Doña Isabel and the conquest of Tenochtitlan ===
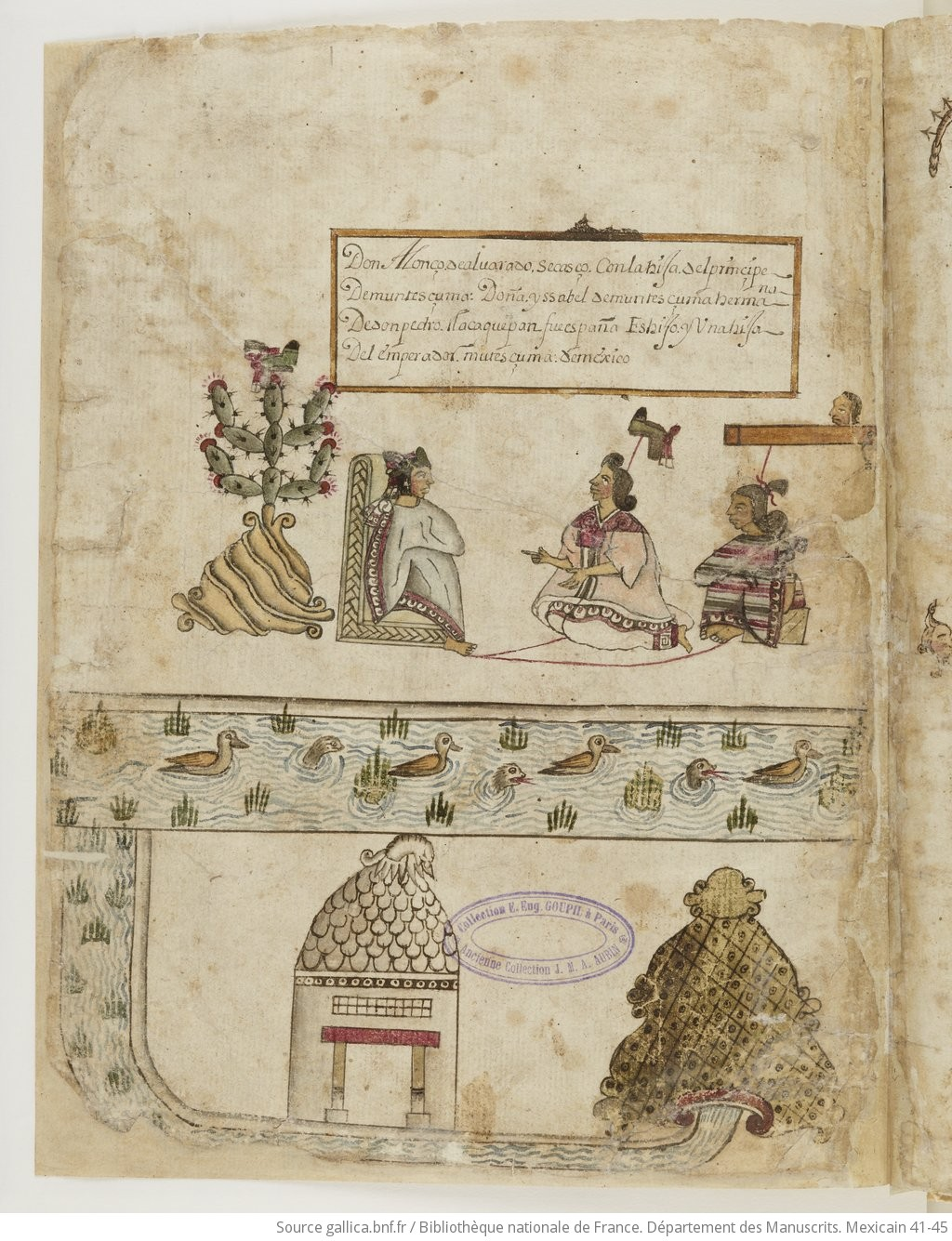
From Codex Cozcatzin, a Nahua-authored codex decrying appropriation of indigenous lands. This image shows Isabel Moctezuma (center, pointing, a gesture of power) between her father, Moctezuma II (right) and brother Pedro Moctezuma (right)

Hernán Cortés and other Spaniards entered Tenochtitlan on November 8, 1519. For several months they lived in Moctezuma's palace. At some time during their sojourn there they took the emperor hostage. The Aztecs revolted and expelled Cortés and his army from Tenochtitlan (La Noche Triste, June 30, 1520). However, Tecuichpotzin was left behind in the city by the Spanish. Aztec leaders quickly married her to Cuitláhuac, the new emperor, and, after he died of smallpox, to Cuauhtémoc.

Cortés returned in 1521 with a large group of Spaniards and Indian allies, mostly from Tlaxcala, to attack Tenochtitlan. The Aztecs, their numbers and morale depleted by a smallpox epidemic, were defeated. Cuauhtémoc and his court attempted to flee Tenochtitlan by boat, but they were captured by the Spanish. On surrendering, Cuauhtémoc asked the Spanish to respect the ladies of his court, including his young wife Tecuichpotzin.

In 1525, Cortés executed Cuauhtemoc and Tecuichpotzin was widowed for the third time.

=== Conversion to Christianity and Dynastic union to Spain ===
Cortés valued Tecuichpotzin as a symbol of what he wished to portray as the continuity of rule between the Aztecs and the Spanish. She was instructed in Christianity, converted to Catholicism, probably in 1526, and baptized as Isabel, the name by which she would thereafter be known. Every indication is that Doña Isabel, the former Aztec princess Tecuichpotzin, was devout in her new religion. She gave generously in alms to the Augustinians, to the point that she was asked to stop. Isabel’s education as a Christian did not include teaching her to read and she remained illiterate.

Cortés arranged the marriage of Doña Isabel to his close colleague Alonso de Grado in June 1526. Part of the marriage arrangement was the granting of a large encomienda to Doña Isabel. The encomienda consisted of the city of Tacuba (about eight kilometres or five miles) west of Tenochtitlan (now called Mexico City) and was the largest encomienda in the Valley of Mexico, an indicator of the importance Cortés gave to Isabel. The encomienda of Doña Isabel endured for centuries. The Spanish and, later, Mexican governments, paid royalties in the form of a pension to the descendants of Doña Isabel until 1933 and a Count of Miravalle, the descendants of Moctezuma, still exists in Spain.

=== Regarding slavery ===
Her opposition to slavery has become a subject of interest lately. Isabel herself was a prominent slave owner, as was traditional in her lineage, but she freed all her slaves by the end of her life.

In July 1526 Cortés gave Alonso de Grado, Isabel's husband, the position of "Visitador Real" – a traveling auditor with authority to exert judicial and executive power in the name of the crown – of New Spain. De Grado was given the specific mission of visiting all the cities and villages, to "inquire about the process of Christianization, and make sure that the laws for the good treatment of the Indians – Laws of Burgos – were being respected. He was to prosecute and punish illegal enslaving. He was to focus on the illegal enslaving of natives, and on the disputes between Spanish civil servants and the local – native – authorities, and he was to send to prison any Spaniard that opposed him".

Alonso died while fulfilling this duty.

Isabel had close contact with the new laws through her husband. She was reported to be initially displeased with the attempts of the Spanish to impose limits in the ownership and treatment of slaves. Despite the growing body of law trying to limit or extinguish native slavery in New Spain that her husband was charged with enforcing, she, as native nobility, had the special privilege of retaining the slaves she owned prior to the conquest and treat them "in her traditional ways”. She even had limited power to adapt the rules in the land of her encomienda. She used this privilege and owned a large number of native slaves throughout her life. However, by the end of her life she freed them all in her testament. In it she also ensured that they were given means to live after freedom.

The causes for this change of heart are uncertain, but set the basis for a recent portrayal of her as an anti-slavery "activist" and a mother of native independence in some ideological spheres. "I want, and I order, and it is my will, that all my slaves, Indian men and women, born from this land, whom Juan Cano, my husband, and I hold as our own, as far as my right over them extends, shall be free of all servitude and captivity, and as free people they shall do as they will, for I don't hold them as slaves; so if they are (slaves) I will and command for them to be free".

=== Cortés, a child, and two more marriages ===
Doña Isabel was described as “very beautiful” and “a very pretty woman for an Indian.” Her fourth husband, Alonso de Grado, soon died and Isabel, about seventeen years old, was widowed for a fourth time. Cortés took her into his household and she soon became pregnant. He quickly married her to another associate, Pedro Gallego de Andrade, and the child, christened Leonor Cortés Moctezuma (Isabel also had a half-sister named Marina or Leonor Moctezuma) was born a few months later. According to Spanish sources, she refused to recognize the child, who was placed in the care of Juan Gutiérrez de Altamirano, another close associate of Cortés. Cortés however accepted the child as his own and ensured that she was brought up well and received an inheritance from his and Doña Isabel’s estate. Isabel’s marriage to Gallego produced a son, Juan de Andrade Gallego Moctezuma, born in 1530. However, Gallego died shortly thereafter. In 1532 she married her sixth husband, Juan Cano de Saavedra, by whom she had three sons and two daughters: Pedro, Gonzalo, Juan, Isabel, and Catalina Cano de Moctezuma. Isabel and Catalina became nuns at the first convent in the Americas, El Convento de la Concepción de la Madre de Dios. Both daughters were well-educated, as presumably were her sons.

=== Death and inheritance ===
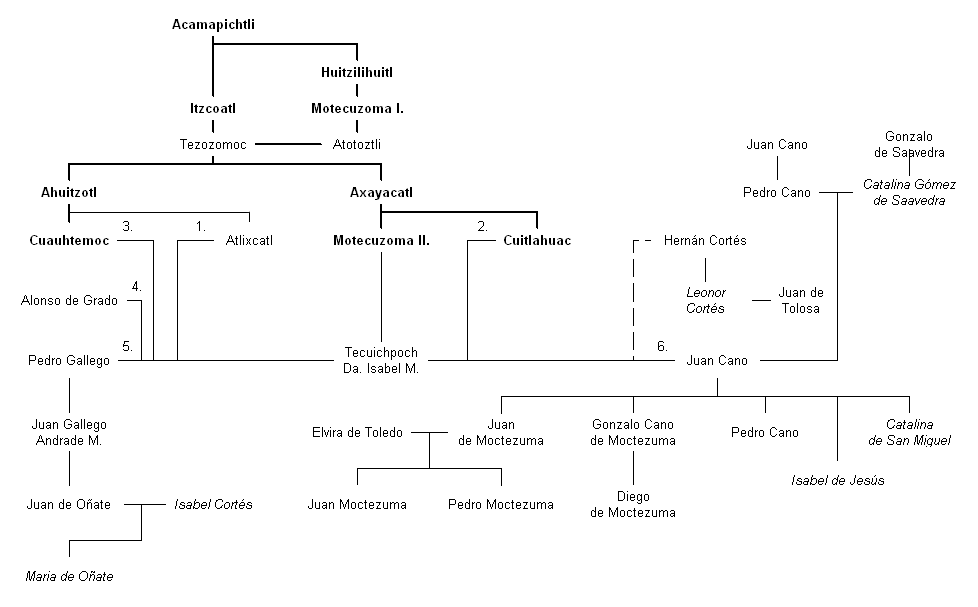
Genealogy of Tecuichpoch

Doña Isabel died in 1550 or 1551. Her estate was large, consisting not only of the encomienda, but also personal possessions she had acquired during her marriages with the Spaniards. Previous to those marriages, she had been an Aztec princess who owned nothing except her distinguished name. Her will is one of the few existing indicators of her personality. She directed that her Indian slaves be set free, one-fifth of the estate be given to the Catholic Church, and that all her outstanding debts, including wages owed to servants, be paid. She had acquired jewelry and other luxury items and requested that many of these be given to her daughters, and that other property be sold and one-third of the proceeds go to her daughters. As a deathbed wish, 20 percent of her estate was to be given to Leonor, her out-of-wedlock child by Cortés. This was apparently a dowry, as Leonor was married, or soon to be married, to Juan de Tolosa in Zacatecas.

Isabel willed the majority of her encomienda to her eldest son, Juan de Andrade, but his inheritance of her encomienda was disputed by her widower, Juan Cano, and Diego Arias de Sotelo, son-in-law of Leonor (Mariana) Moctezuma, who he claimed was Moctezuma's true heir. The result after years of litigation was that Arias de Sotelo's claim was dismissed, and Tacuba was divided between Cano and Andrade.

=== Modern-day descendants ===
The Miravalle line of Spanish nobility began with Isabel's son, Juan de Andrade. Her sons, Pedro and Gonzalo Cano, became prominent citizens of Mexico City. Her son, Juan Cano Moctezuma, married into a prominent family in Cáceres, Spain, where the Palacio de Toledo-Moctezuma still exists. Isabel's last husband, Juan Cano, died in Seville in 1572. The mestizo lineage that originates on Isabel and her sister branched out through Spanish nobility. Since converted native nobility were considered Spanish nobility by the Spaniards, the blood of Aztec nobility was highly respected, and the chance of intermixing with their lineage was treasured. Isabel and Leonor's descendants quickly intermarried with the most important families of Extremadura, one of the richest areas of Spain at the time. It is estimated that Isabel has 2000 descendants today in Spain alone. The claims to nobility of the count of Miravalle, the count of La Enrejada, the duke of Ahumada, the duke of Abrantes, and the duke of Monctezuma come directly from her and her sister. Isabel is the ancestress of Rosario Nadal, the wife of Kyril, Prince of Preslav, Carlos Fitz-James Stuart, 19th Duke of Alba, Marie-Liesse Claude Anne Rolande de Rohan-Chabot, the wife of Prince Eudes Thibaut Joseph Marie of Orléans and Ignacio de Medina y Fernández de Córdoba, 19th Duke of Segorbe, husband of Princess Maria da Glória, Duchess of Segorbe, the former wife of Alexander, Crown Prince of Yugoslavia.

== Importance ==
Very little is known about Doña Isabel beyond a few facts of her life. She seems to have made the transition from Aztec princess to Spanish doña successfully. Her descendants were the most prominent example of her day of mestizaje – melding Spanish and indigenous Mexican ancestries – that would characterize the future of Mexico. The Spanish wished to inculcate in the indigenous populations "the economic, religious, and cultural orientation of Spain." Isabel, whether by desire or necessity, was the first great success of the assimilation of Spanish and native Mexicans.

== See also ==
- List of Tenochtitlan rulers
- Mariana Leonor Moctezuma
