= RFA Abadol =

Coordinates: 58°57′40″N 7°49′39″W

History

United Kingdom
- Name: SS Montezuma (1899–1915); RFA Abadol (1915–1917); RFA Oakleaf (February–July 1917)
- Builder: Alexander Stephen and Sons
- Yard number: 383
- Launched: 11 July 1899
- Commissioned: September 1899
- Fate: Torpedoed 25 July 1917

General characteristics
- Tonnage: 7,345 GRT
- Length: 485 ft (148 m)
- Beam: 59 ft (18 m)
- Propulsion: 2 x 3 cyl triple expansion steam. 660 nhp. Twin screws
- Speed: 13 knots (24 km/h; 15 mph)

RFA Abadol was a British cargo liner, converted several times to end as a tanker in the Royal Fleet Auxiliary. She was previously known as SS Montezuma from her launch in 1899 until 1915. From February 1917, she was named RFA Oakleaf. A few months later she was lost without casualties to a German torpedo attack.

== Construction ==
She was built in Glasgow as the Elder Dempster cargo liner Montezuma by Alexander Stephen and Sons in 1899.

== Service history ==
Montezuma was in New Orleans when in early February 1900 she was chartered to take mules to South Africa for the British troops in the Second Boer War. After completing eight round voyages as a Boer War Transport, she was acquired by Canadian Pacific in 1903 and was converted to carry a thousand 3rd Class passengers the following year. The ship was requisitioned by the Admiralty in 1914 and converted to a dummy battleship, mimicking HMS Iron Duke. In 1915 she became the tanker RFA Abadol and in February 1917 she was renamed RFA Oakleaf. The vessel was lost five months later when on 25 July 1917 she was torpedoed by the German submarine UC-41 64 nautical miles (119 km) NW-¼W from the Butt of Lewis without any casualties.
