= Montezuma (1822 ship) =

American packet and whaler ship

History

United States
- Name: Montezuma
- Owner: 1822:Thomas P. Cope; 1861:US Navy
- Builder: Robert Burton, Philadelphia
- Fate: Sunk as an obstruction 1862

General characteristics
- Tons burthen: 424 (bm)

Montezuma was launched in Philadelphia in 1822 as a packet ship. In 1841 her owner sold her and she became a whaler operating out of New London, Connecticut. Between 1841 and 1861 she made six voyages to the Indian Ocean, the Pacific, and the Bering Sea. Late in 1861, during the American Civil War, the USS Navy purchased her to sink her in January 1862 as a harbour obstruction.

== Packet ==
Thomas Pim Cope, a Philadelphia Quaker, in 1821 established his first packet line to Liverpool, England. Montezuma made 46 voyages between 1822 and 1841 between Philadelphia and Liverpool.

== Whaler ==
In 1841 Cope sold Montezuma for $15,000. Her new owners sailed her to New London and proceeded to use her as a whaler. At the time of her sale one observer described her as "one of the most substantial ships of her age that belong to Philadelphia".

Whaling voyage #1 (1841-1844): Captain William M. Baker sailed in September 1841 for the Indian Ocean. Montezuma returned in 1844 with 3300 barrels of whale oil and 26,400 pounds of whalebone.

Whaling voyage #2 (1844-1847): Captain Baker sailed in June 1844 for the Indian Ocean and the northwest coast of North America. Montezuma returned in May 1847 with 60 barrels of sperm oil, 3350 barrels of whale oil, and 34,000 pounds of whalebone.

Whaling voyage #3 (1848-1851): Captain George G. Benjamin sailed in August 1848 for the west coasts of South and North America. Montezuma returned in February 1851 with 443 barrels of sperm oil and 300 barrels of whale oil.

Whaling voyage #4 (1851-1854): Captain Benjamin sailed in July 1851 for the North Pacific. Montezuma returned in May 1854 with 133 barrels of sperm oil, 2444 barrels of whale oil, and 600 pounds of whalebone.

Whaling voyage #5 (1854-1857): Captain Joseph B. Forsyth sailed in October 1854 for the North Pacific. Montezuma returned in June 1857 with 266 barrels of sperm oil, 1930 barrels of whale oil, and 24,800 pounds of whalebone.

Whaling voyage #6 (1857-1861): Captain Benjamin Franklin Homan sailed in September 1857 for the North Pacific. Montezuma returned in August 1861 with 130 barrels of sperm oil, 2348 barrels of whale oil, and 38,572 pounds of whalebone.

== US Navy ==
The US Navy purchased Montezuma at New London on 29 November 1861 to sink her as part of the second "stone fleet". Although she was originally destined for Savannah in January, the Navy sank her as an obstruction to Southern shipping in Wilmington Narrows, Lazarette Creek, Georgia, in April 1862.

== Post script ==
In 1890 a whale was killed in the Bering Sea with a "toggle" harpoon head in its body bearing Montezuma's mark.
