= Duke of Moctezuma de Tultengo =

Spanish hereditary title held by descendants of Moctezuma II

Dukedom of Moctezuma
- Creation date: October 11, 1865
- Created by: Queen Isabella II of Spain
- First holder: Antonio María Marcilla de Teruel-Moctezuma y Navarro
- Present holder: Juan José Marcilla de Teruel-Moctezuma y Valcárcel
- Heir apparent: Sofia Marcilla de Teruel-Moctezuma y Capelo

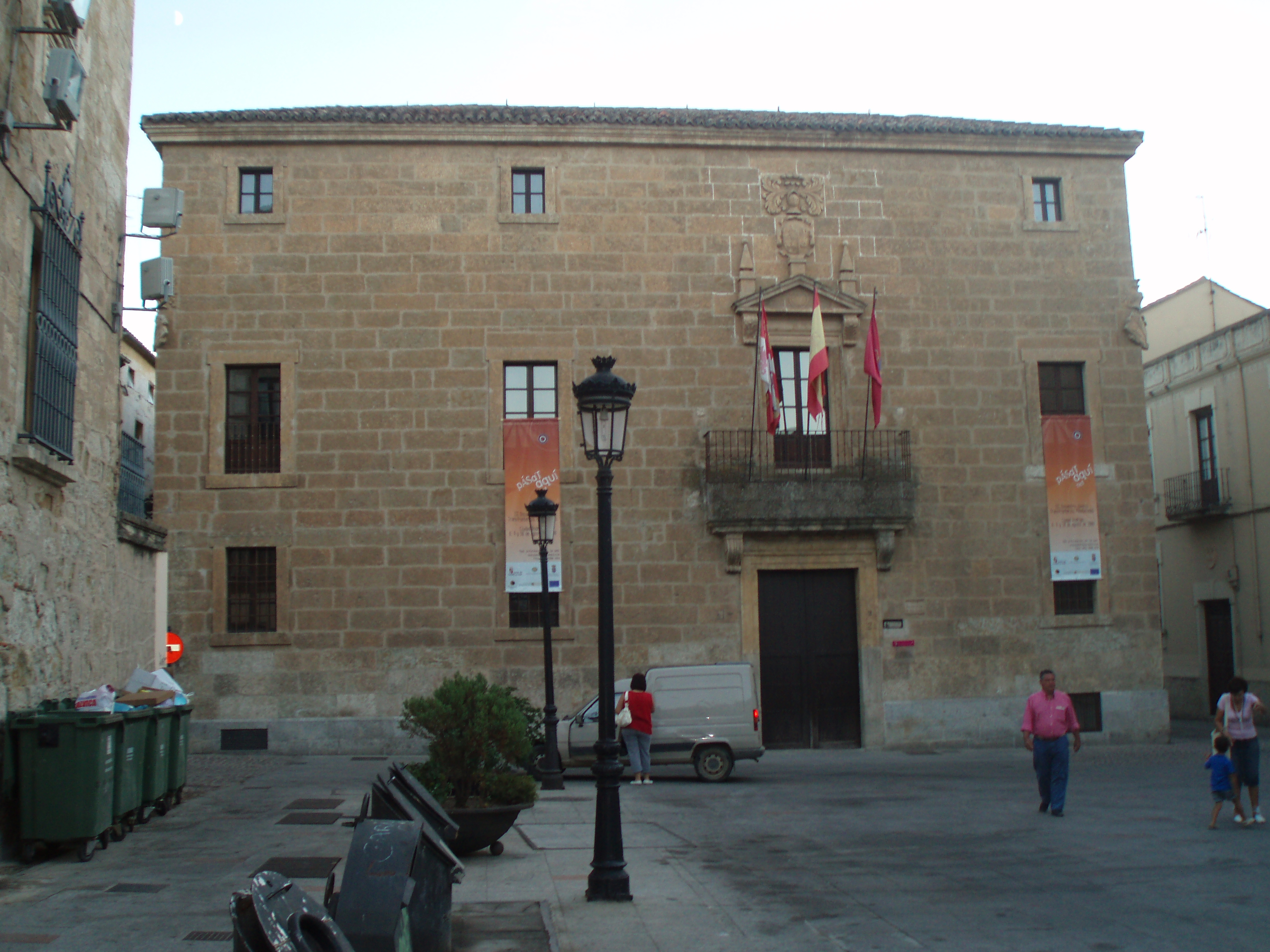
The Palace of Moctezuma, located in Ciudad Rodrigo, Salamanca, Spain, one of many palaces erected by the descendants of Moctezuma II.

Duke of Moctezuma (Spanish: Duque de Moctezuma) is a hereditary title of Spanish nobility held by a line of descendants of Emperor Moctezuma II, the ninth Tlatoani, or ruler, of Tenochtitlan. Since 1766, the title has been associated with a Grandeza de España, or a place in the Spanish peerage — the highest honor accorded to Spanish nobility (see also Mexican nobility).

== History ==
The original title of Count of Moctezuma, from which it descends, was given by King Philip IV of Spain in 1627 to Pedro Tesifón Moctezuma de la Cueva, 1st Viscount of Ilucán, Lord of Tula and Peza, a Knight of Santiago and a great-grandson of Moctezuma II through his son Pedro de Moctezuma Tlacahuepan and grandson Diego Luis Moctezuma (Ihuitl Temoc), Pedro Tesifón Moctezuma de la Cueva's father, who went to Spain. Charles II of Spain later granted the second holder of this title the qualification of de Tultengo, in reference to a town in the Mexican state of Hidalgo which was part of the inheritance of Moctezuma's son Pedro. All subsequent holders from 1635-1865 used the title, "Count of Moctezuma de Tultengo" until the advancement to the rank of Duke removed de Tultengo. The title of Duke of Moctezuma (without the qualification of 'de Tultengo') was granted to Antonio María Marcilla de Teruel-Moctezuma y Navarro, 14th Count of Moctezuma de Tultengo and 11th Marquis of Tenebrón on October 11, 1865 by Queen Isabella II of Spain.

The current holder of the title is Juan José Marcilla de Teruel-Moctezuma y Valcárcel, 6th Duke of Moctezuma. His father had assumed the title, and was regranted the qualification of de Tultengo (as the second Count of Moctezuma was in 1639) by King Juan Carlos I of Spain in 1992.

== List of holders ==
Counts of Moctezuma Created by King Philip IV of Spain
1	Pedro Tesifón Moctezuma de la Cueva Valenzuela y Bocanegra (1584-1639)
Counts of Moctezuma de Tultengo Designated by King Charles II of Spain
2	Diego Luis Tesifón Moctezuma y Porres (1627-1680)
3	Jerónima María Moctezuma y Jofré de Loaysa (1668-1692)
4	Fausta Dominga Sarmiento de Vallardares y Moctezuma (1689-1697)
5	Melchora Juana Sarmiento de Valladares y Moctezuma (1691-1717)
6	Teresa Francisca Nieto de Silva y Cisneros Moctezuma (1669-1736)
7	Jerónimo María de Oca y Nieto de Silva (1695-1778)
8	Joaquín Ginés de Oca y Mendoza Caamaño (1733-1795)
9	Clara de Oca y Mendoza Caamaño (1723-1799)
10	José Antonio Marcilla de Teruel Moctezuma y Pinilla (1755-1807)
11	Alfonso Marcilla de Teruel Moctezuma y García de Alcaraz (1784-1836)
12	Pedro Nolasco Marcilla de Teruel Moctezuma y García de Alcaraz (1779-1849)
13	Antonio María Marcilla de Teruel Moctezuma y Navarro (1814-1890) later 1st Duke of Moctezuma
Dukes of Moctezuma Created by Queen Isabella II of Spain
1	Antonio María Marcilla de Teruel Moctezuma y Navarro (1814-1890)
2	Luis Beltrán Moctezuma Marcilla de Teruel y Liñán (1854-1928)
3	Luis Moctezuma-Marcilla de Teruel y Gómez de Arteche (1896-1936)
4	Fernando Moctezuma-Marcilla de Teruel y Gómez de Arteche (1898-1986)
Dukes of Moctezuma de Tultengo Designated by King Juan Carlos I of Spain
5	Juan José Marcilla de Teruel Moctezuma y Jiménez (1924-2012)
6	Juan José Marcilla de Teruel-Moctezuma y Valcárcel (1958-)

== Family tree ==
9th Tlatoani of Tenochtitlan; Moctezuma II (1466-1520)
Pedro Moctezuma
Diego Luis de Moctezuma
1st Count; Pedro Tesifón (1584-1639)
Diego de Cisneros	Teresa Francisca (1623-1695)	2nd Count; Diego Luis (1627-1680)
Andrés Nieto de Silva	Jerónima Manuela (1644-1691)	Isabel María (1649-1713)	Jorge Fajardo; Salido y Molina	3rd Countess; Jerónima (1668-1692)	José Sarmiento de Valladares (1643-1708)
Gaspar de Oca; Sarmiento	6th Countess; Teresa (1669-1736)	Antonia Jerónima (1678-1727)	Alonso Marcilla de Teruel	4th Countess; Fausta (1689-1697)	5th Countess; Melchora (1691-1717)
7th Count; Jerónimo (1695-1778)	Pedro (1717-1770)
9th Countess; Clara (1723-1799)	8th Count; Joaquín (1733-1795)	10th Count; José (1755-1807)	Antonio (1760-1825)
11th Count; Alfonso (1784-1836)	12th Count; Pedro (1779-1849)
13th Count→1st Duke; Antonio (1814-1890)	Pedro (1827-1879)
2nd Duke; Luis (1854-1928)	Pedro (1873-1954)
3rd Duke; Luis (1896-1936)	4th Duke; Fernando (1898-1986)	Juan (1895-1967)
5th Duke; Juan (1924-2012)
6th Duke; Juan (1958-)
Sofia (1982-)

== Bibliography ==
- GONZÁLEZ ACOSTA, Alejandro. “Los herederos de Moctezuma”. Boletín Millares Carlo. ISSN 0211-2140, Nº. 20, 2001. Págs. 151-158.
- ÁLVAREZ NOGAL, Carlos. “El Conde de Moctezuma en el Reino de Granada.” El reino de Granada y el Nuevo Mundo. V Congreso Internacional de Historia de América, mayo de 1992, Vol. 2, 1994. ISBN 84-7807-110-5. Págs. 105-116.
