= Glicéria Tupinambá =

Indigenous Brazilian anthropologist and artist

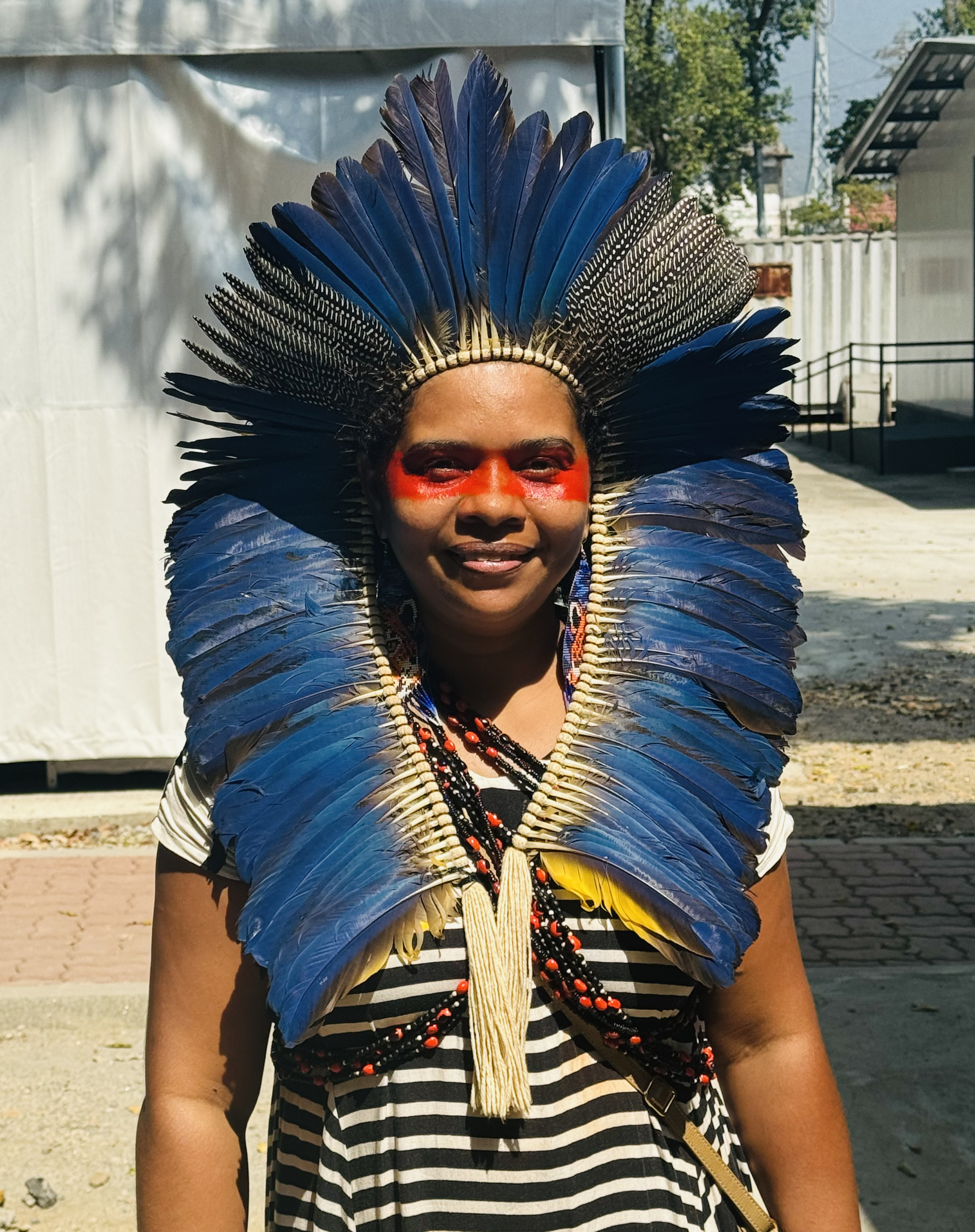
- Glicéria Tupinambá in 2024
- Born: 1982 (age 43–44); Serra do Padeiro, Olivença, Ilhéus, Bahia, Brazil
- Other names: Glicéria Jesus da Silva, Célia Tupinambá
- Citizenship: Brazilian
- Education: Federal Institute of Bahia (IFBA)
- Occupations: Artist teacher indigenous leader
- Known for: Work with the Tupinambá cape documentary Voz Das Mulheres Indígenas
- Relatives: Babau Tupinambá (sibling)
- Awards: PIPA Prize (2023); Funarte Visual Arts Award (2020–2021)

Glicéria Tupinambá (1982), also known as Glicéria Jesus da Silva or Célia Tupinambá, is an indigenous artist, teacher and leader. She became internationally known for her work with the Tupinambá cape and for her work on the documentary Voz Das Mulheres Indígenas.

== Biography ==
=== Early years and education ===
A member of the Tupinambá indigenous people of Brazil, Glicéria was born in Serra do Padeiro, a mountain range located on the outskirts of Olivença, a district of the city of Ilhéus, in the interior of Bahia in 1982. Her people are known as the Tupinambás of Olivença. She has nine siblings, including Babau Tupinambá, an activist for indigenous rights. She completed her formal education at a public school in the city of Buerarema, also in the interior of Bahia, where she finished high school in 1996.

She resumed her academic life in 2016 when she enrolled at the Federal Institute of Bahia (IFBA) to study for a degree in Indigenous Intercultural Education. In 2023, she moved to Rio de Janeiro to study for a master's degree in anthropology at the Federal University of Rio de Janeiro (UFRJ), where she defended her dissertation in 2025. In the same year, she enrolled in a doctoral program in social anthropology, also at UFRJ.

== Tupinambá cape ==
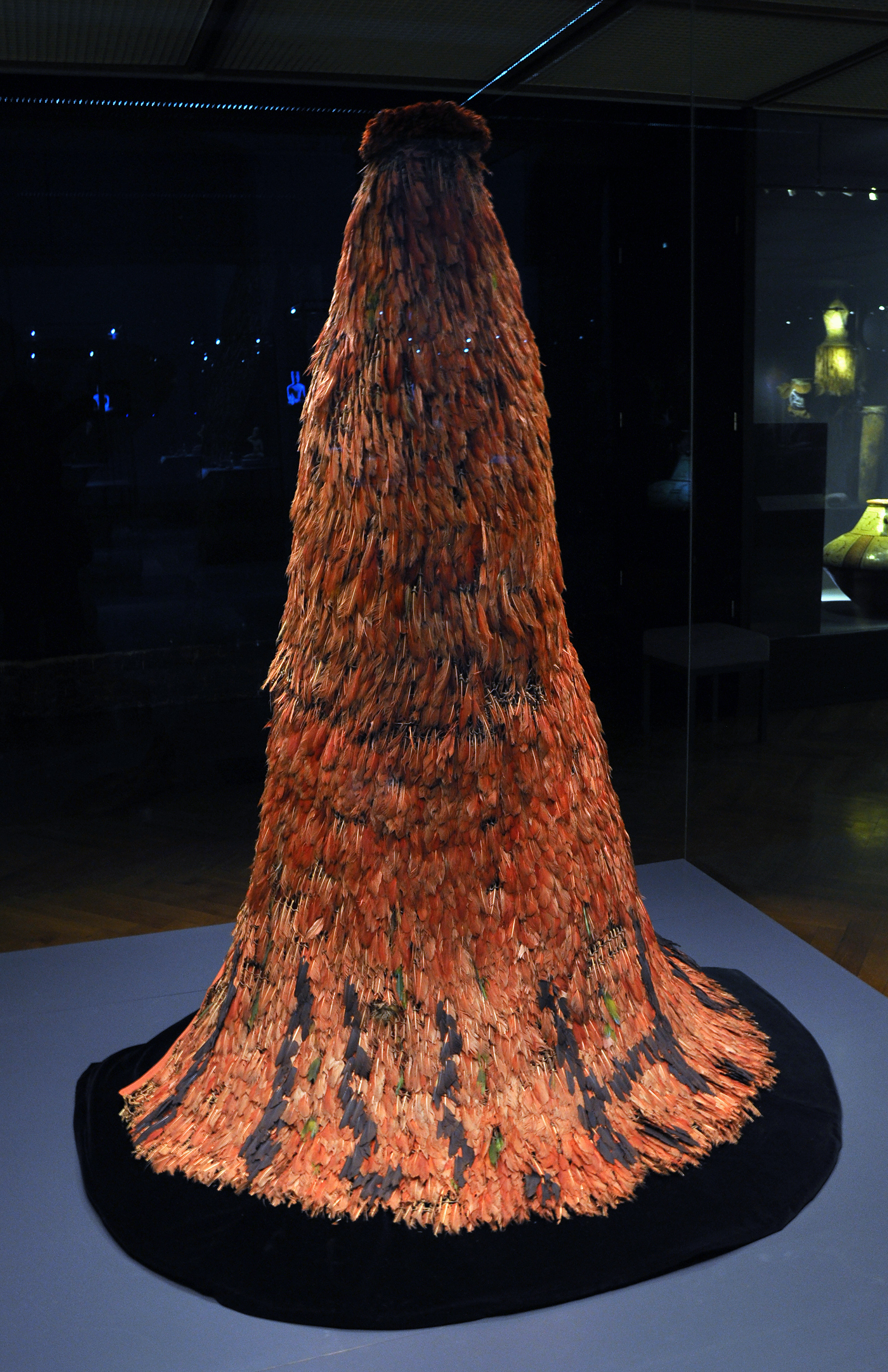
Tupinambá cape.

In 2006, Glicéria began researching the Tupinambá cape with her family members. She discovered that the technique was still used to make fishing nets and jereré. From this discovery, Glicéria was able to advance her research on the making of capes, a work she continues to develop to this day, as each piece has a unique process. During her research, she came into contact with images of 16th and 17th century cloaks for the first time, through the classes of Professor Patrícia Navarro, from State University of Feira de Santana (UEFS). The cape was part of the exhibition “Os primeiros brasileiros” (The First Brazilians), organized at the National Museum of Brazil by anthropologist João Pacheco de Oliveira. The cape was not damaged by the fire that engulfed the museum and is now safe at the Memorial of Indigenous Peoples in Brasília.

=== First contact with the cape ===
The first contact with the cape occurred in 2006 in southern Bahia during a seminar given by anthropologist Patrícia Navarro. Glicéria Tupinambá was then a teacher and director of the Tupinambá association in Serra dos Padeiros. During the seminar, the speaker projected an image of the Tupinambá cloak, which was on display at the National Museum of Denmark (Nationalmuseet). Glicéria describes that moment as one of “enchantment,” filled with spiritual emotion and what she calls “the call of the cape.” From there, she began her research on the garment, its ritual importance, and its manufacturing techniques. At the same time, a project began within the indigenous community itself, involving everyone's knowledge, to seek to understand the sacred cape. Glicéria then began making her first cloak to offer as a gift to the enchanted spiritual beings, her ancestors, at the Festa de São Sebastião.

During this period, Glicéria did not have the necessary skills to construct the weave or the feathers. This was because the knowledge she had acquired about the cape came solely from her experience with photographic materials. Therefore, in an attempt to replicate the original capes, she used the technique of constructing jereré (nets used locally for fishing) measuring one meter twenty centimeters long and fifty centimeters wide. Made in the colors of the territory, containing shades of brown, green, and white, with the cooperation of his community. As for the Tupinambá ceremonial cape, it has a special meaning directly linked to the culture of this people, being more than just a material artifact. It tells the story of the period in which it was used. So much so that for Glicéria, this reunion with the cloak meant a reunion with her ancestors from distant times.

For this reason, the proximity of the cloak to representatives of the Tupinambá people is of great importance for these indigenous communities to continue nurturing this experience through their cultural activities. In addition, there are other pieces that are part of the feather art collection in various museums across Europe. Glicéria says that each Tupinambá cape has its own function, forming part of a grand ceremony that she hopes to one day bring back to her community.

A moment that greatly contributed to this technical and scientific improvement behind the cloak was Glicéria's visit to the technical collections of two European museums, one of which was the National Museum of Denmark and the other the Musée du Quai Branly – Jacques Chirac in France. At these museums, she had the opportunity to analyze the pieces directly, providing Glicéria with knowledge for the creation of new pieces that she sees as a means of spreading the message of the indigenous struggle for their territory. In addition, the experience also included other more sensitive channels, such as messages received specifically through birds and dreams from ancestors, through her religiosity.

=== Research experience abroad ===
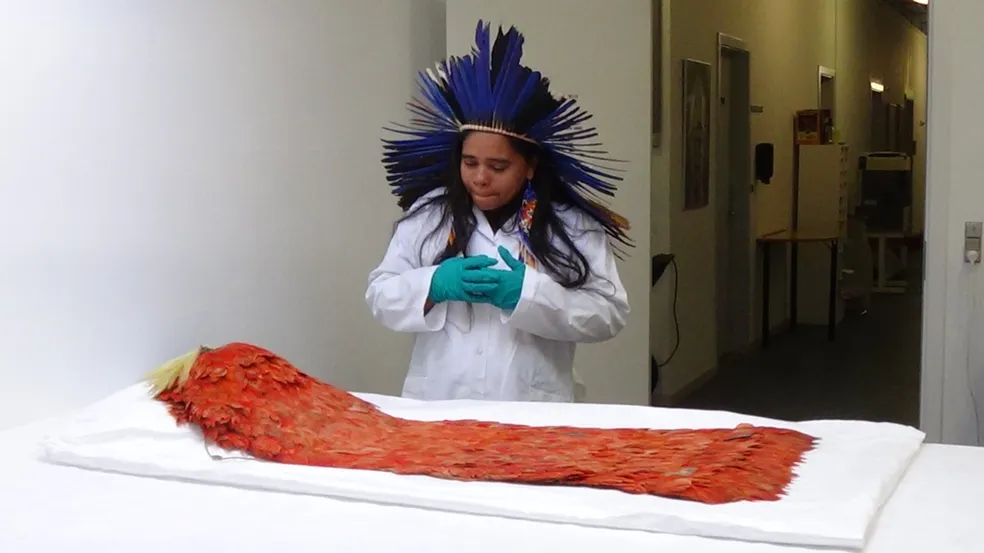
Glicéria Tupinambá and the cloak at the National Museum of Denmark. This is the specimen that returned to Brazil in 2024.

It was only in 2000 that Brazil gained access to the mantle, during the “Redescobrimento Brasil + 500” exhibition held in São Paulo. The cape was loaned to the exhibition by the National Museum of Denmark. Indigenous leader Aloísio Cunha Silva and Nivalda Amaral de Jesus, known as Amotara (her indigenous name), attended the exhibition. For Amotara, “this contact was a reunion with a transcendental memory of her Tupinambá people from Olivença, in Bahia.” It was after this visit that Amotara requested the repatriation of the cloak to the village.

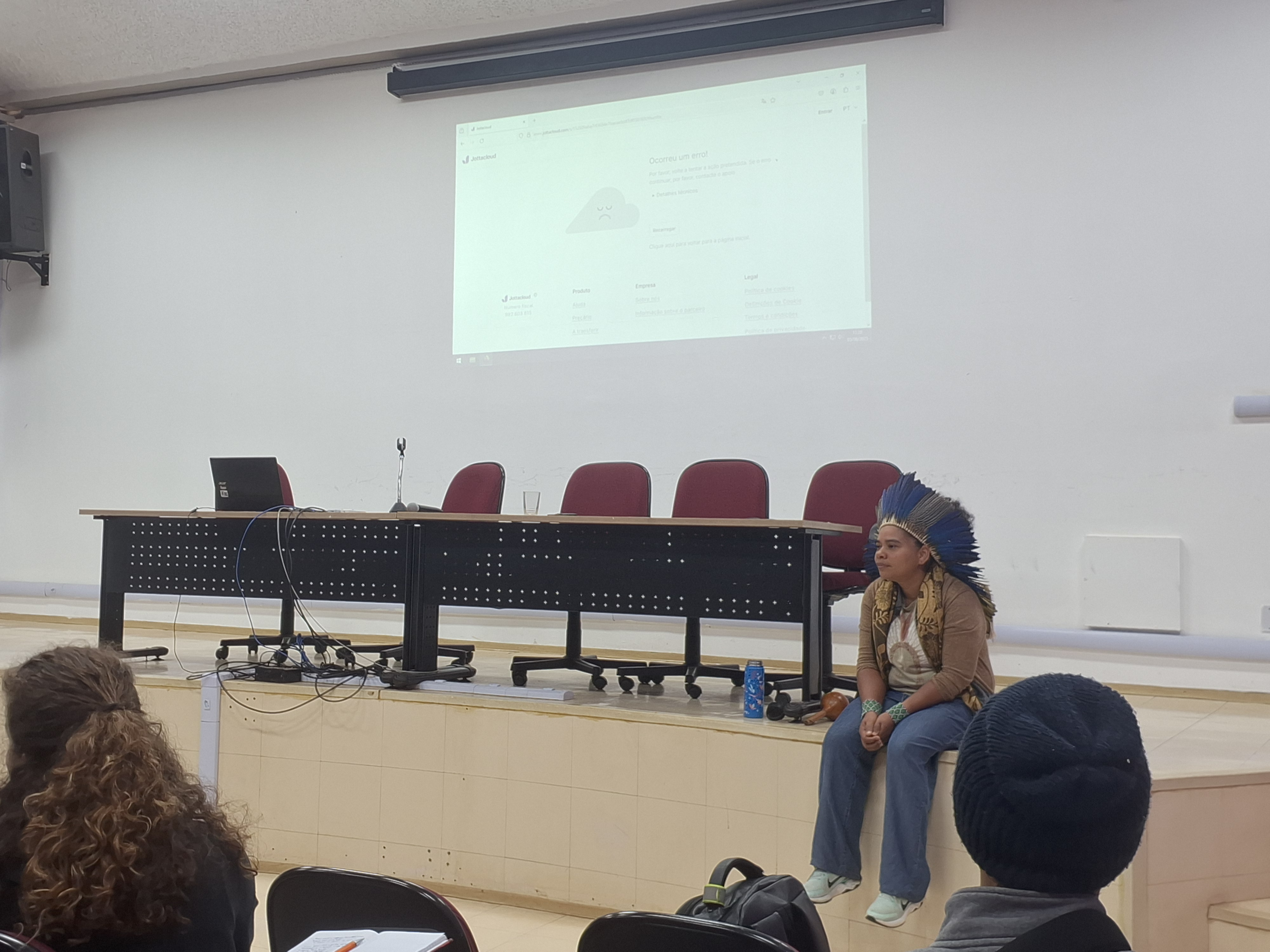
Glicéria Tupinambá giving a lecture at the State University of Campinas.

Glicéria was not present at the exhibition in São Paulo. It was through a photograph of the cloak in the National Museum of Denmark that Glicéria recreated, in 2006, with the help of the entire community, the first cape for a cult festival called Encantados, which is held by the Tupinambás every January. Later, this cape was donated to the National Museum of Rio de Janeiro and is part of the exhibition “The First Brazilians.”

Glicéria tells zum magazine how she got hold of the photo: “At that time, Professor Patrícia Navarro, from the State University of Feira de Santana, came to give history and anthropology classes in the village and brought an old overhead projector. She had some photographs of the cape and projected them onto the wall. I gazed at that image, enjoying its beauty, and tried to look at the weave. The image was very poor, but I could understand the weave.”

During a trip to Paris in 2018, Glicéria came into contact with the cloak that was in the Quai Branly Museum. During this visit, Glicéria was able to verify that the stitching used on the cape was the same as that used on the jereré.

== Awards and recognitions ==
For her research and work preserving the history and memory of indigenous cultures, Glicéria has been recognized and won several awards. These include:

- PIPA Prize, awarded artist: 2023;
- First indigenous artist to represent Brazil at the Venice Biennale;
- Funarte Visual Arts Award: 2020—2021.

In 2025, the Brazilian documentary, Eu Ouvi o Chamado: O Retorno dos Mantos Tupinambá, directed by Robson Dias and Myrza Munizque, narrates the trajectory of Glicéria as a researcher on the Tupinambá mantle, was one of the winners in the Docs-In-Progress category at the Cannes Film Festival, which annually awards promising documentaries in editing or post-production.
