= Featherwork =

Use of feathers in traditional art

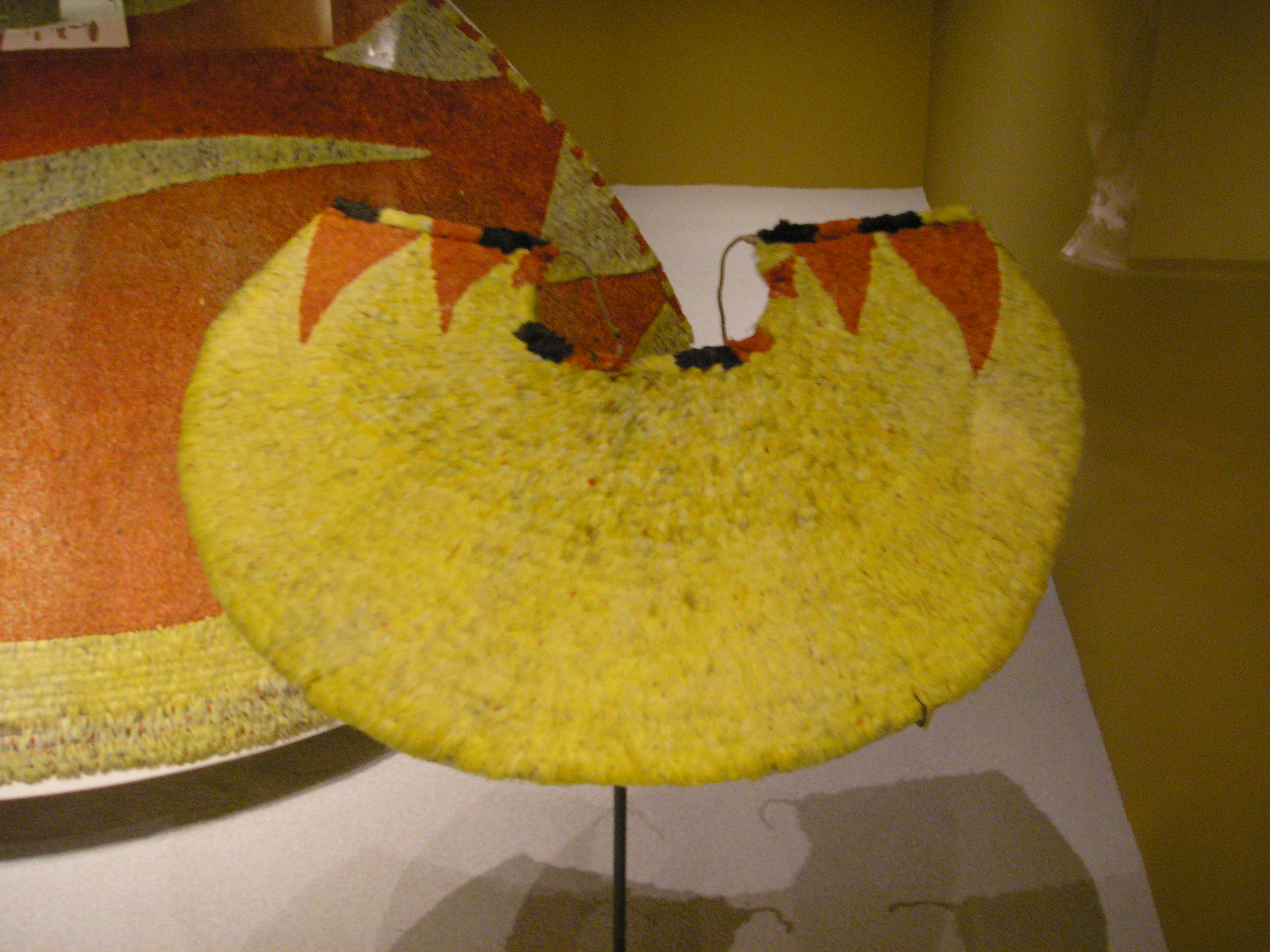
A Hawaiian ʻahuʻula (feathered cape).

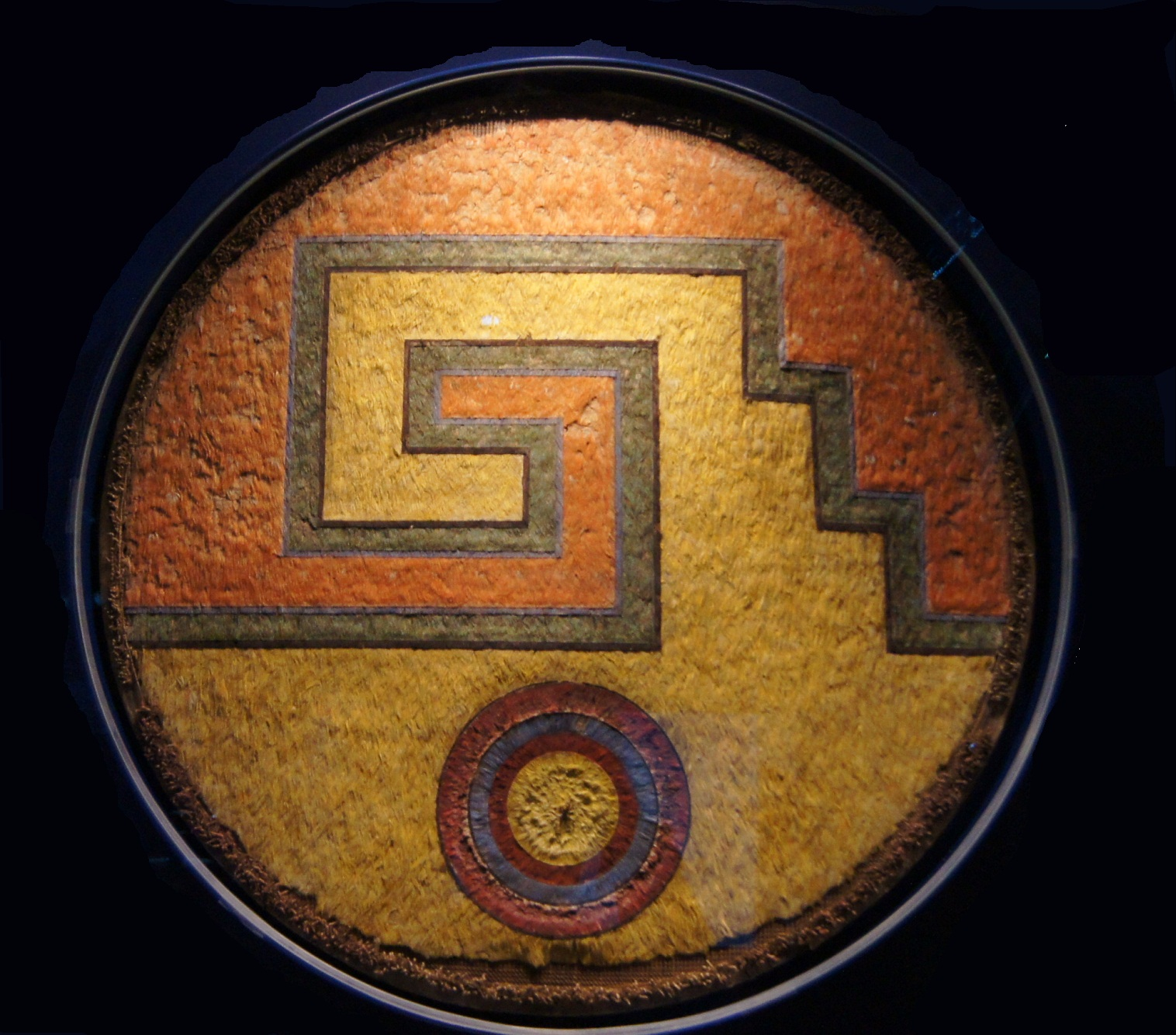
Aztec feather shield 'meander and sun" (around 1520, Landesmuseum Württemberg)

Featherwork is the working of feathers into a work of art or cultural artifact. Practiced in many parts of the world, this was especially elaborate among the peoples of Oceania and the Americas, such as the Incas and Aztecs.

Though some bird populations may have been put under pressure by plume hunting even before Western contact, the late 19th century trade in feathers, especially for ladies' hats in Western countries, drove many species to the brink of extinction; some did not survive at all.

== Pacific ==
Feathered cloaks and headdresses include the ʻahuʻula capes and mahiole helmets were worn by Hawaiian royalty; many are now on display at the Bishop Museum on Honolulu, including the largest survival, Nāhiʻenaʻena's Pāʻū, a princess's cloak, and Liloa's Kāʻei, a sash. Kāhili are a type of feathered standard, another symbol of royalty. Feathers were also in the construction of some kiʻi ('religious image'). The introduction of foreign species, overhunting, and environment changes drove birds with desirable feathers, such as the ʻōʻō and mamo, to extinction, although the ʻiʻiwi managed to survive despite its popularity.

The Maori of New Zealand used featherwork to construct cloaks for clothing and to decorate kete (bags) and weapons.

== Americas ==
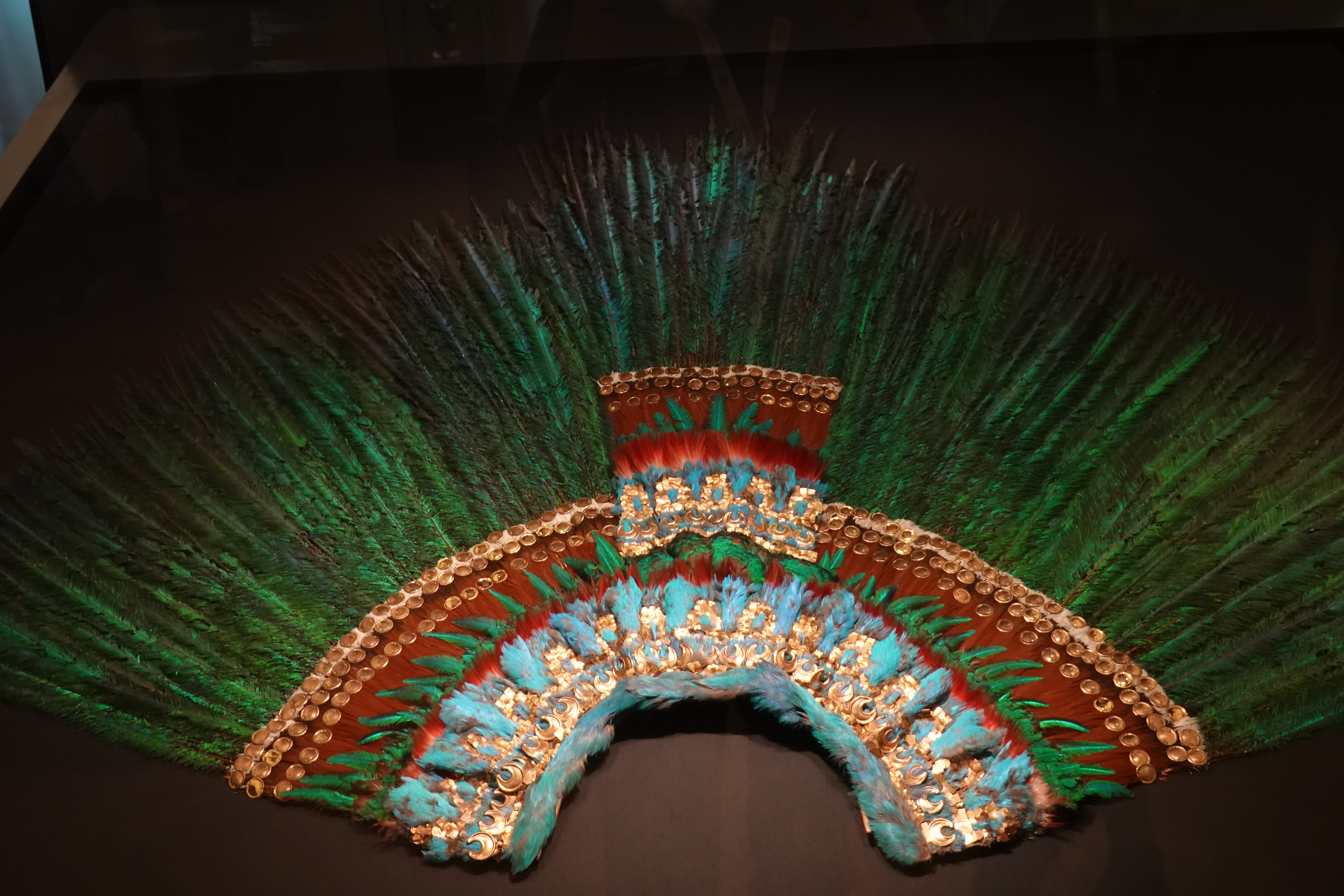
Montezuma's headdress, now in Vienna

Mexican feather work was a Pre-Columbian art form which was continued after the Conquest of the Aztec Empire, originally organized by the Spanish missionaries into a luxury export trade, sending objects back to Europe. Immediately after the conquest existing objects such as Montezuma's headdress, now in Vienna, were admired in the courts of Europe.

The Tupinambá cape was a type made in the Amazon forests, of which the best preserved of the dozen or so survivals is now in Brussels, Belgium. The feathered war bonnet of North American Plains Indians has long been iconic. The Cherokee people of Southeastern Northern America used swan or turkey feathers to make capes.

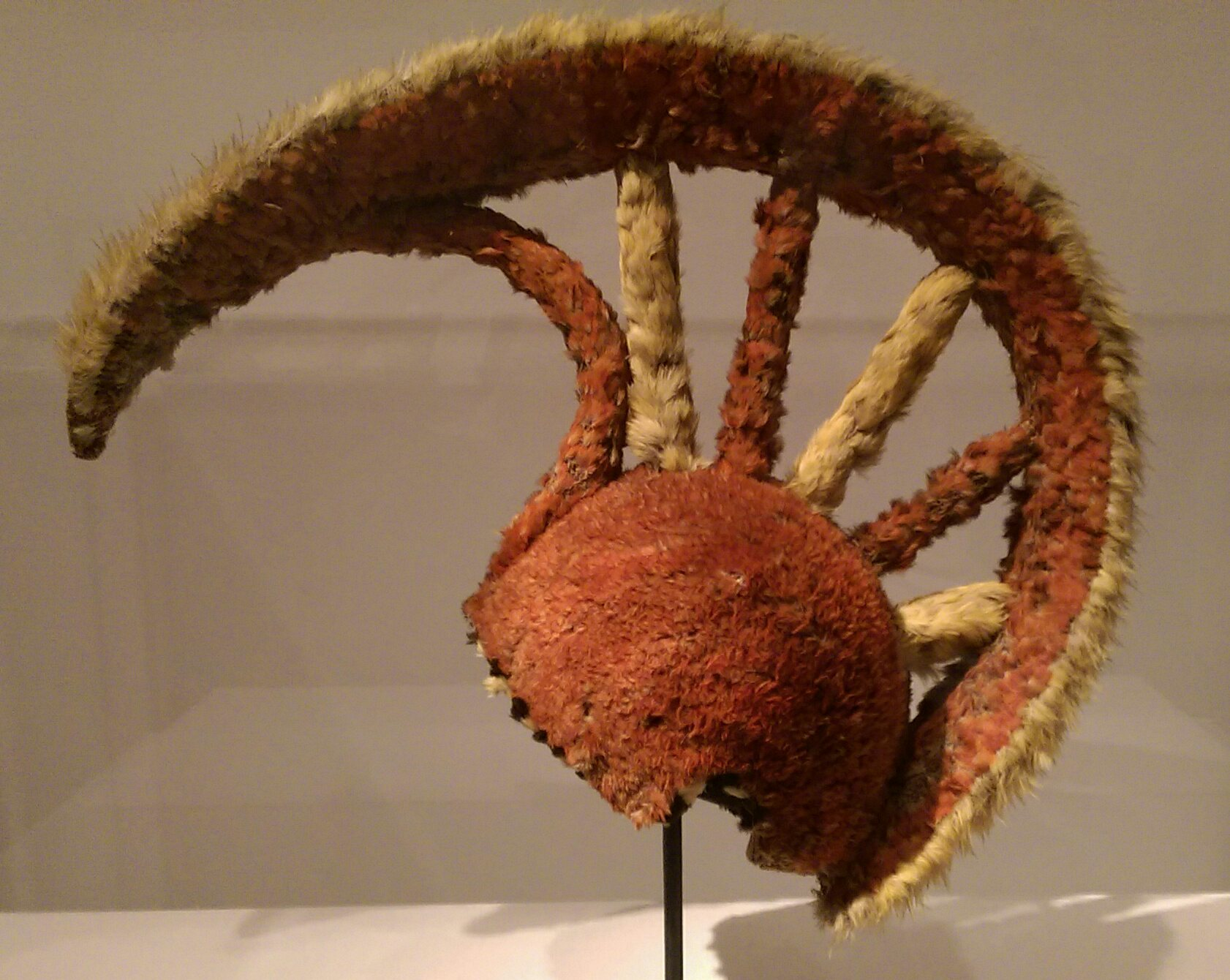
Hawaiian mahiole helmet collected by Robert Gray in 1789

Although featherwork is primarily used for clothing, headdresses, ceremonial shields, and tapestries, the Pomo peoples of California are famous for the minute featherwork of their grass baskets, including the fully feathered basket style, many of which are on display at the National Museum of the American Indian in Washington.

== Europe ==
The medieval European style called feather tights was more usually made with cloth or leather flaps simulating feathers in the costumes of angels (and devils) in liturgical dramas, pageants and other displays. The feather elements were sewn onto body suits.

== See also ==
- Coyotlinahual, Aztec patron god of featherworkers
- The Feather Book of Dionisio Minaggio, a 17th-century Italian book of images made entirely from bird feathers
