= José Cândido de Carvalho =

Brazilian writer (1914–1989)

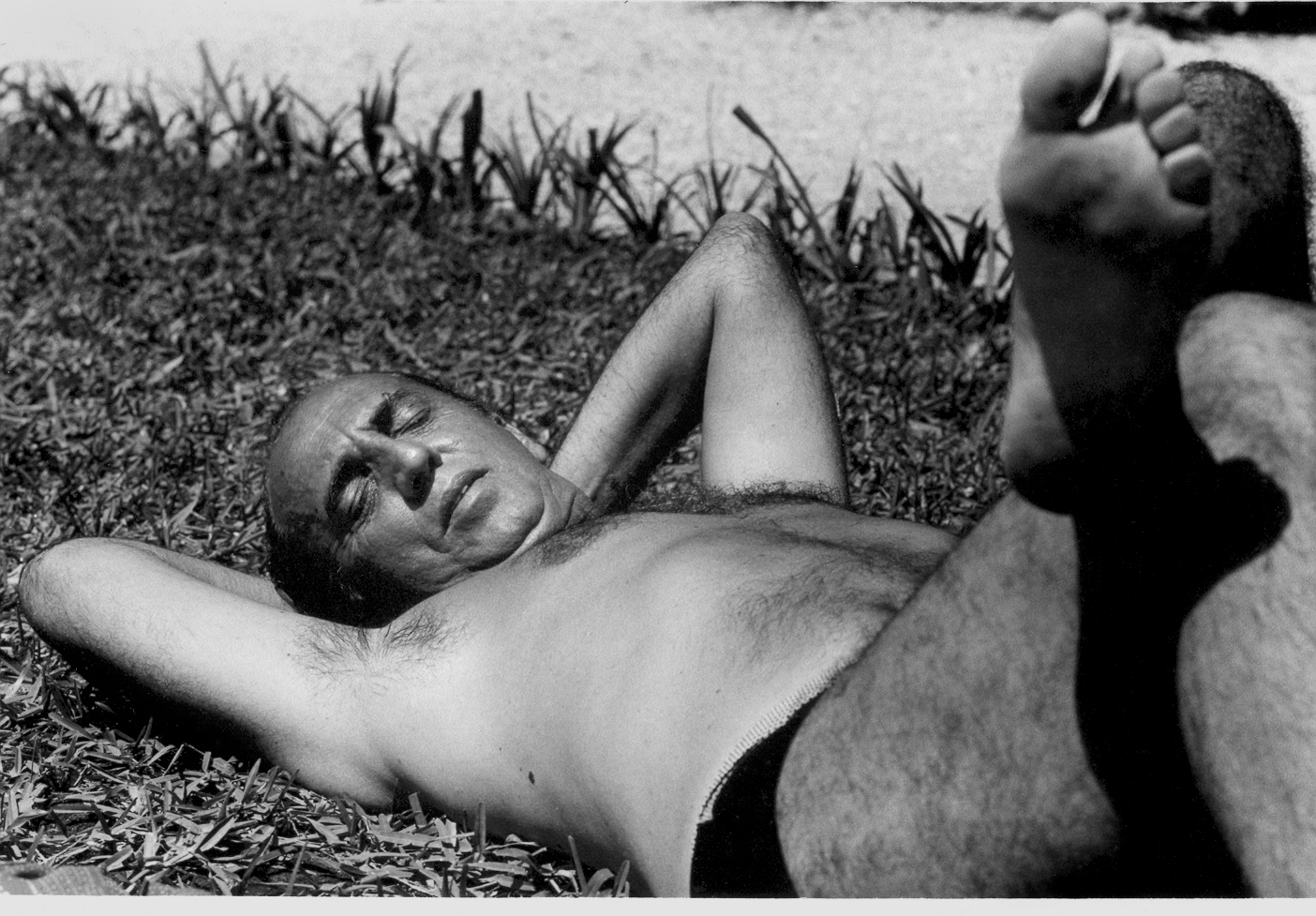
- Born: August 5, 1914; Campos dos Goytacazes, Brazil
- Died: August 1, 1989 (aged 74); Niterói, Rio de Janeiro, Brazil
- Occupations: Lawyer, writer, journalist
- Known for: The Colonel and the Werewolf

José Cândido de Carvalho was a Brazilian writer born in Campos dos Goytacazes, Rio de Janeiro on August 5, 1914. His novel O Coronel e o Lobisomem (English: The Colonel and the Werewolf) was the basis for a TV series and feature film. He died on August 1, 1989.

== Early life ==
The son of a farmer, he started working in the school holidays at a sugar refinery. On leaving school he became a reviewer with various local newspapers eventually becoming editor of O Liberal (English: The Liberal). He graduated in law from the University of Rio de Janeiro in 1937, but soon abandoned the profession.

== Career ==
His first novel was Look at the sky, Frederico! published in 1939. He moved to the city of Rio de Janeiro where he worked for various newspapers and in radio until shortly before his death in 1989.

From 1957 he was working on O Cruzeiro (English: The Cruise) and in 1964 published his second novel, The Colonel and the Werewolf, a bestseller with more than fifty five editions to date (2012). Considered one of the great novels of Brazilian literature, it was subsequently published in Portugal and translated into English, Spanish, French and German. The book also won the 1965 Prêmio Jabuti (English Tortoise Prize), the Luísa Coelho Neto and Claudio de Sousa award.

When he died he was working on his third novel, The King Belshazzar, which remained unfinished.

== Brazilian Academy of Letters and Funarte ==
In 1974 he was elected to a position on the Brazilian Academy of Letters, occupying chair 31 from 1974 until his death in 1989. The Academy is composed of 40 members, known as "immortals", chosen from among the citizens of Brazil, who have published recognized works or books of literary value. In 1975, he was elected the first President of Funarte, a foundation linked to the Ministry of Culture created to foster and fund the arts. He remained in the position until 1981.

Preceded by Cassiano Ricardo	Brazilian Academy of Letters - Occupant of the 31 chair 1974 — 1989	Succeeded by Geraldo França de Lima
