= Jean-Louis Rouméguère =

French landscape painter

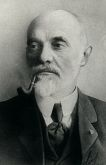

Jean-Louis Rouméguère (20 June 1863, Auch – 25 November 1925, Auch) was a French landscape painter.

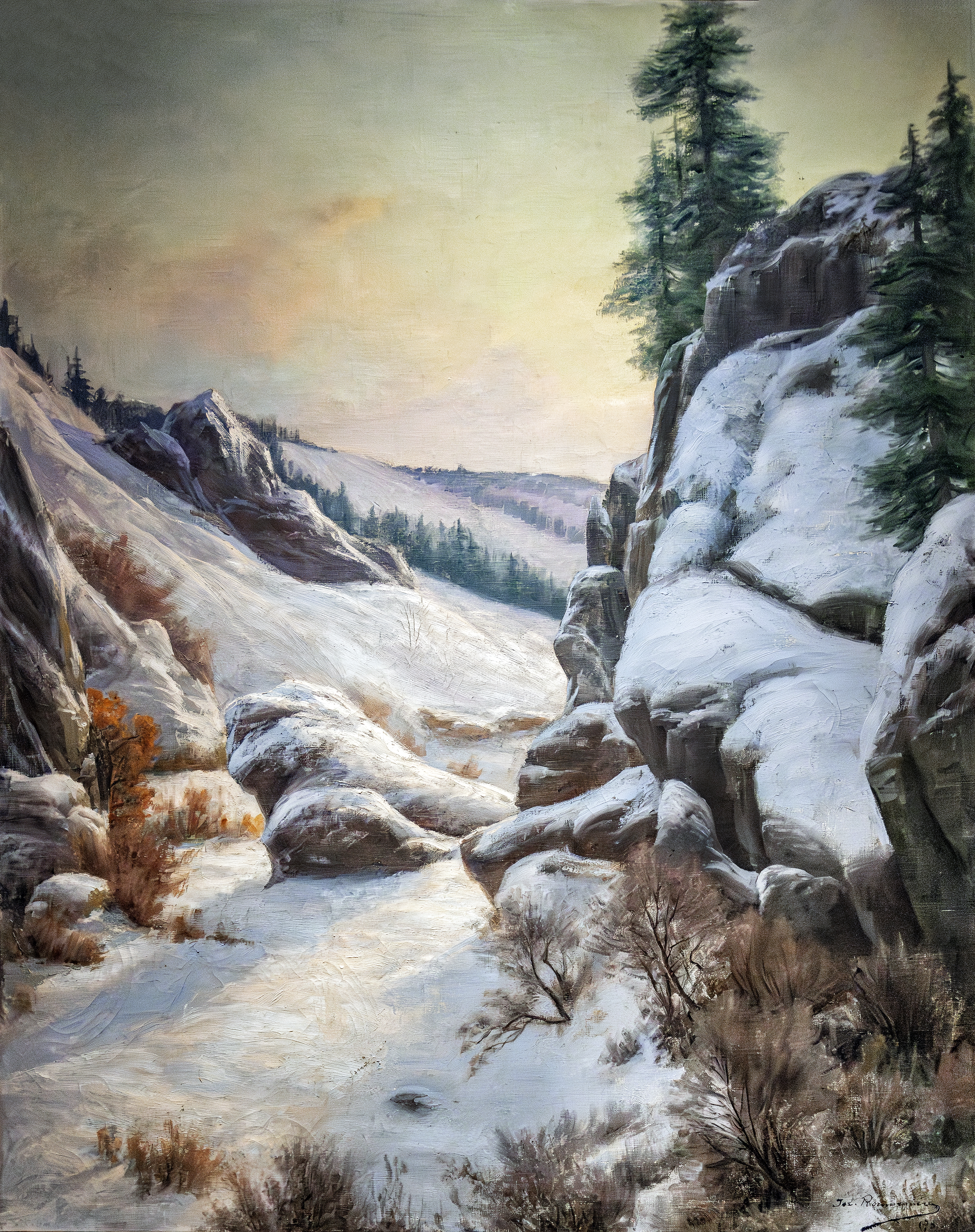
Frost on snow - Musée des Amériques

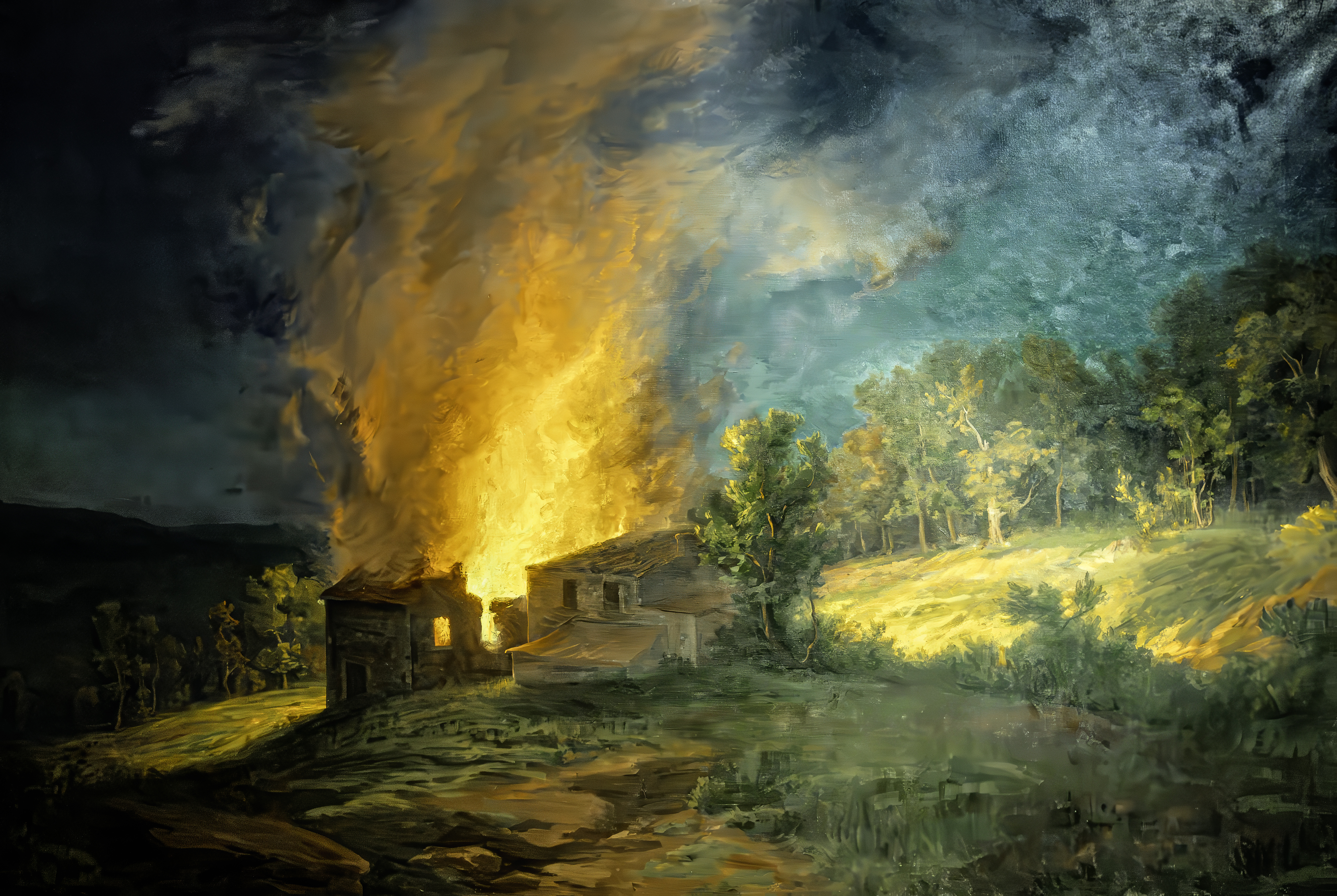
Fire at dusk - Musée des Amériques
