= Gabriel Lettu =

French painter

Gabriel Lettu (1775 – c.1859) was a French painter, engraver and printer, born in Paris and active mostly in Auch between 1830 and 1840. The Musée des Jacobins houses at least four paintings by him.

== Works ==
- Henry IV's Château at Pau in Béarn, lithograph, 1825–1830, 51,6x37cm, Musée National du Château de Pau.
- Assumption of the Virgin, high altarpiece of the parish church of Notre-Dame-de-l'Assomption, Castelnau-Magnoac (Hautes-Pyrénées), produced in Auch in March 1830, oil on canvas, 287x210cm.
- The Agony of Saint Martin, oil on canvas, 1841, 162x260cm, church at Réjaumont (Gers).
- Inauguration of the statue of Maréchal Lannes in Lectoure, oil on canvas, 49x41cm, private collection (auctioned at Sothebys 02/12/2003).
- Crucifixion (attributed), early 19th century, chapelle Saint-Barthélémy du lieu-dit Mongardin (Saint-Médard, Gers)
- Visitor guide to Auch Cathedral, with engravings complementing the museum of sacred art, 13 pages of text and 12 black and white plates, 15,5x23cm
