= Musée des Amériques =

Museum in Auch, France

Coordinates: 43.6472°N 0.5874°E

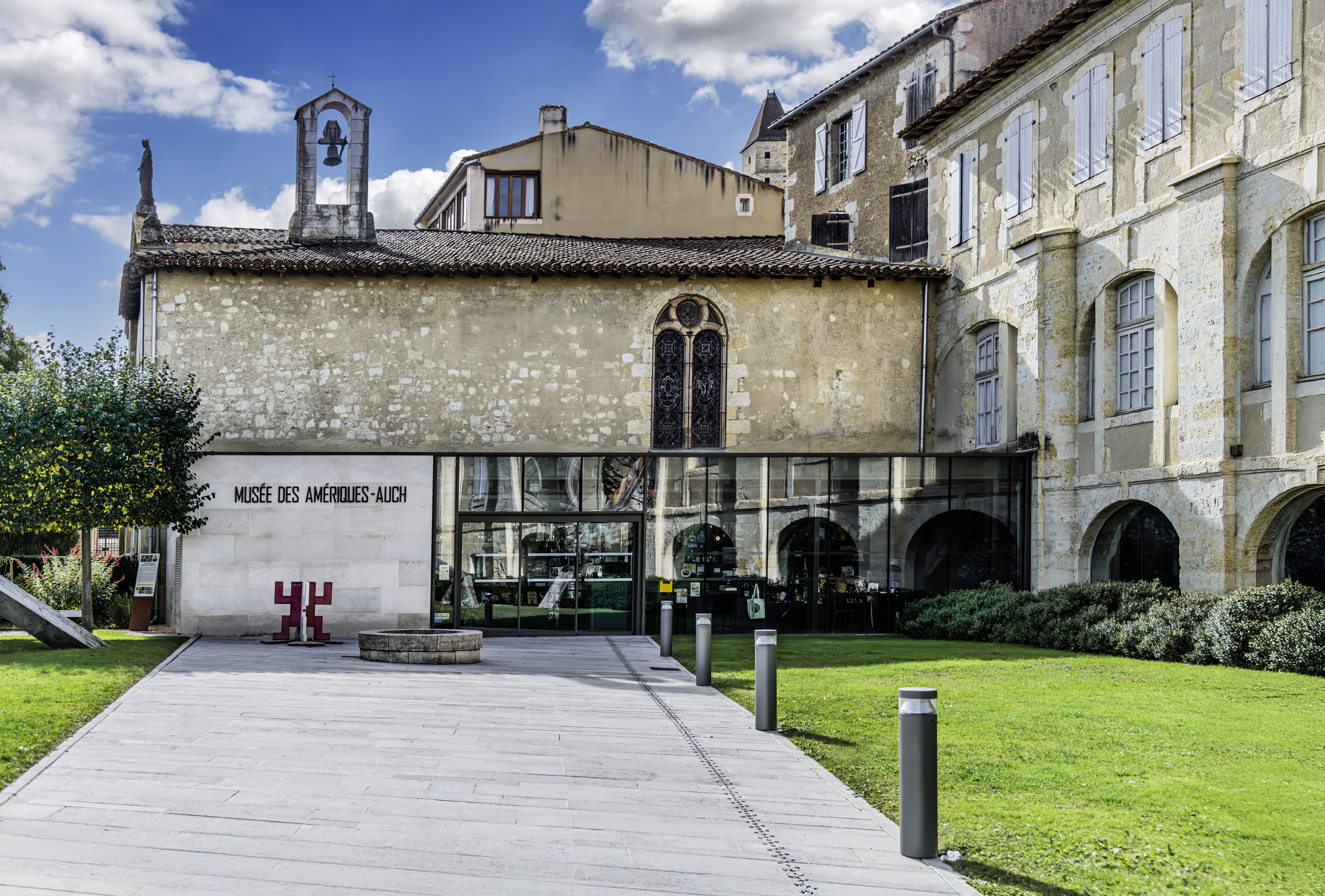
Entrance to the Museum of the Americas in Auch

The Musée des Amériques, formerly known as the Musée des Jacobins, is the town museum in Auch, the capital of the Gers department in France. It is located in the old city between the riverbank and the Cathédrale Sainte-Marie d'Auch. It houses France's second biggest collection of Pre-Columbian art after the quai Branly, with which it has collaborated for many years. The museum garden is a 1600 square metre parc à la française containing plants brought back from the Americas by the Conquistadors.

== History ==
It was founded on 16 December 1793 and is one of France's oldest museums, housing over 20,000 objects, including 8,000 Pre-Columbian works. The building housing it, known as the 'Couvent des Jacobins', was listed as a historic monument and was originally built as a Jacobin convent in the 15th century. The museum moved into it in 1979 after a major restoration project.

== Collections ==
Its collections fall into six sections. Les collections du musée s'organisent autour de six sections :

- Pre-Columbian archaeology
- Latin-American sacred art
- Antiquities :
  - Ancient Egypt
  - Gallo-Roman
- Medieval art (polychrome sculptures of the Virgin and Child)
- Decorative art (faïence, furniture, musical instruments)
- Art and popular traditions of Gascony (traditional costumes),
- Fine arts - paintings, 17th to 20th centuries (Jacob and Jean-Baptiste Smets, Gabriel Lettu, Antonin Carlès, Jean-Louis Rouméguère, Mario Cavaglieri).

== Major objects ==
- Statue of Trajan, 1st century AD, discovered near Rome in the 18th century, from the Borghese collection
- The Mass of St Gregory - the oldest Mexican feather work artwork in the world, showing the Mass of Saint Gregory and dating to 1539, displayed in Paris from 18 March 2008 to 19 July 2009 in the exhibition Planète Métisse at the musée du quai Branly.
- Marble bust of Louis XVI attributed to Houdon and listed as a Historic Monument.
Statue of Trajan

The Mass of St Gregory, 1539.

Olifant of Saint-Orens 11th.

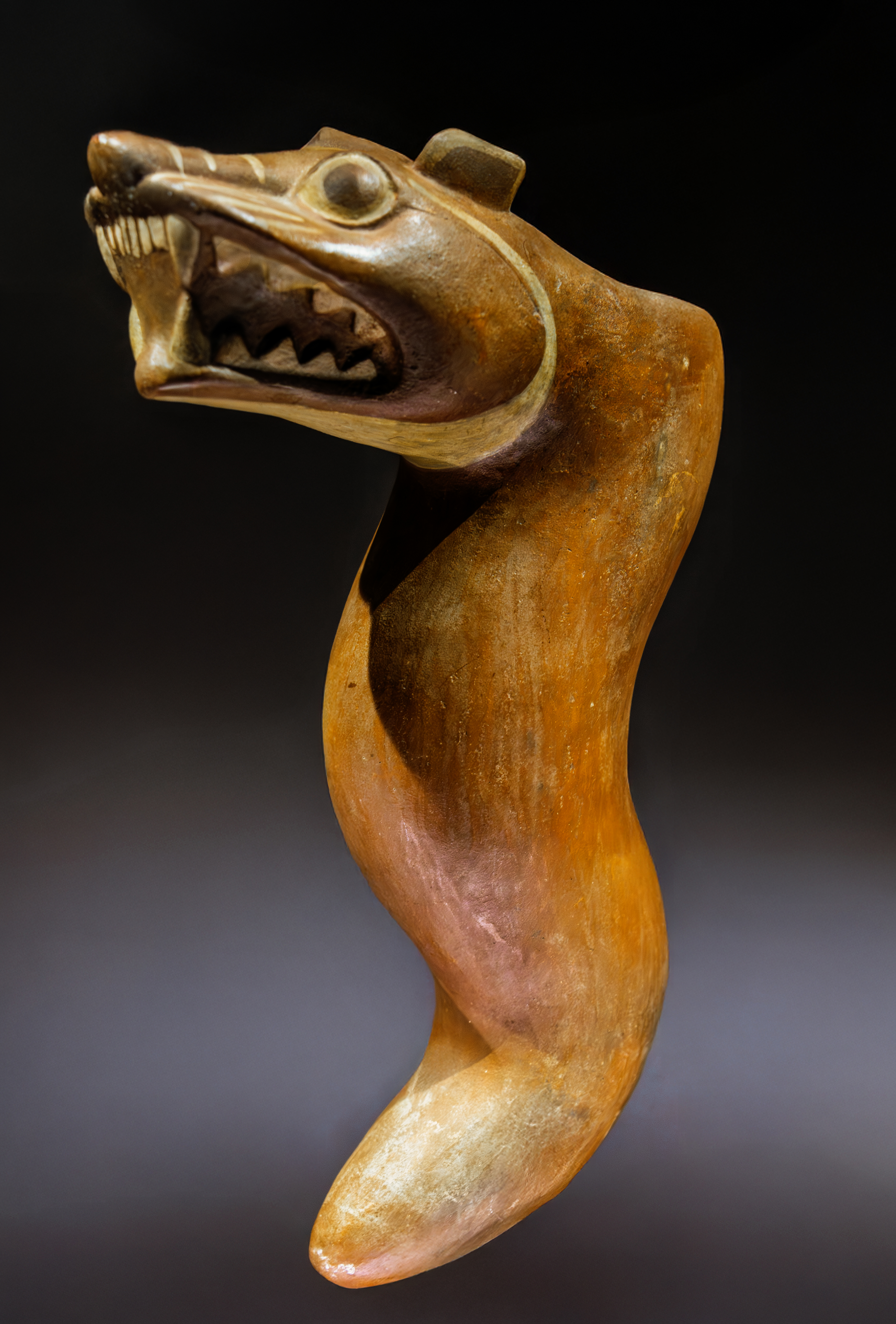
Libation vase representing a fox snake Mochica culture - Peru
