= Mario Cavaglieri =

Italian painter

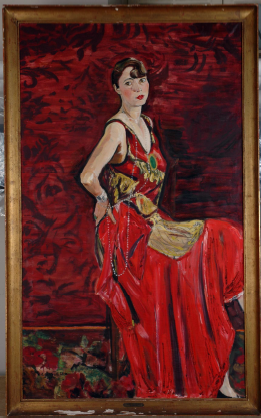
Painting by Cavaglieri in the Musée des Jacobins d'Auch.

Mario Cavaglieri (1887, Rovigo – 1969, maison de Peyloubère, Pavie, Gers, France) was an Italian painter.

== Life ==
From a wealthy family, he initially studied law at Padua University but soon abandoned his studies in favour of an artistic career. He began exhibiting aged twenty and his main period of activity was between 1913 and 1920. He was particularly active in portraiture. He retired to the French countryside in 1925 and bought the maison de Peyloubère in Pavie, moving in soon afterwards and living there the outbreak of the Second World War – he moved back to Italy, but his family was deported and forced to sell the house until his return to France in 1946 – it was made an Historic Monument in 1996. From then on Cavaglieri alternated between Paris and Pavie, holding onto the house until his death. His first retrospective was organized by the Musée des Augustins in Toulouse in 1974, whilst in 2007 his birthplace of Rovigo organized a major international retrospective at the Palazzo Roverella. Several of his works are now in the Musée des Jacobins.
