= Statute of Museums =

Brazilian law

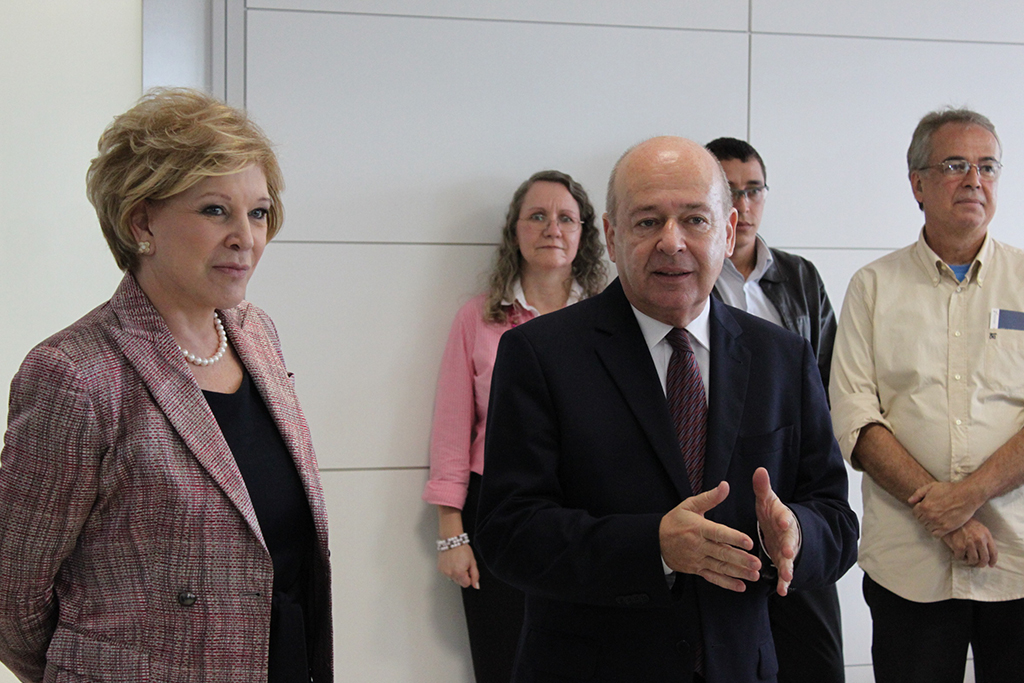
Marta Suplicy, then Minister of Culture, visiting the Brazilian Institute of Museums by virtue of the decree that regulates the Statute of Museums .

Statute of Museums is a Brazilian law (Law 11904) enacted on January 14, 2009. This law provides for the principles of museums such as the appreciation and preservation of cultural and environmental heritage, universal access, respect and appreciation of cultural diversity and institutional exchange, and museums must prepare the Museological Plan.

== Regulation ==
The regulation of the statute was an expectation of the Ministry of Culture under the command of Ana de Hollanda, but which, however, did not materialize. Effective since January 2009, the Statute of Museums establishes, among other things, the criteria for creating, operating and closing museums. The statute was finally regulated in 2013, but the measures that would guarantee, in theory, the security and conservation of the places that keep part of the history of the country or of the world, in practice, are not usually followed. According to the Federal Council of Museology (Cofem), the public budget allocated to museums is precarious and does not guarantee requirements considered fundamental to preserve collections.
