= Fundação Nacional de Artes =

Brazilian foundation

National Arts Foundation - Funarte
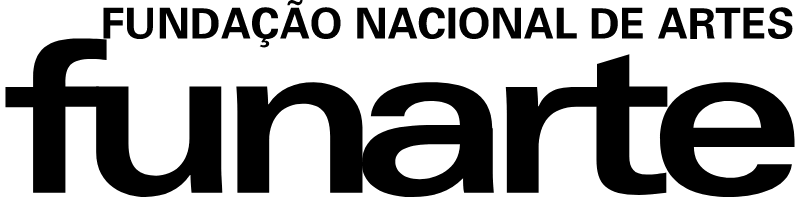
- Company type: Foundation
- Founded: December 16, 1975; 49 years ago
- Key people: Maria Marighella (President)
- Website: www.funarte.gov.br

The Fundação Nacional de Artes (National Arts Foundation), Funarte is a foundation of the Brazilian government linked to the Ministry of Culture. It operates throughout the national territory and is the agency responsible for developing public policies to foster the visual arts, music, dance, theater, and circus.

== Overview ==
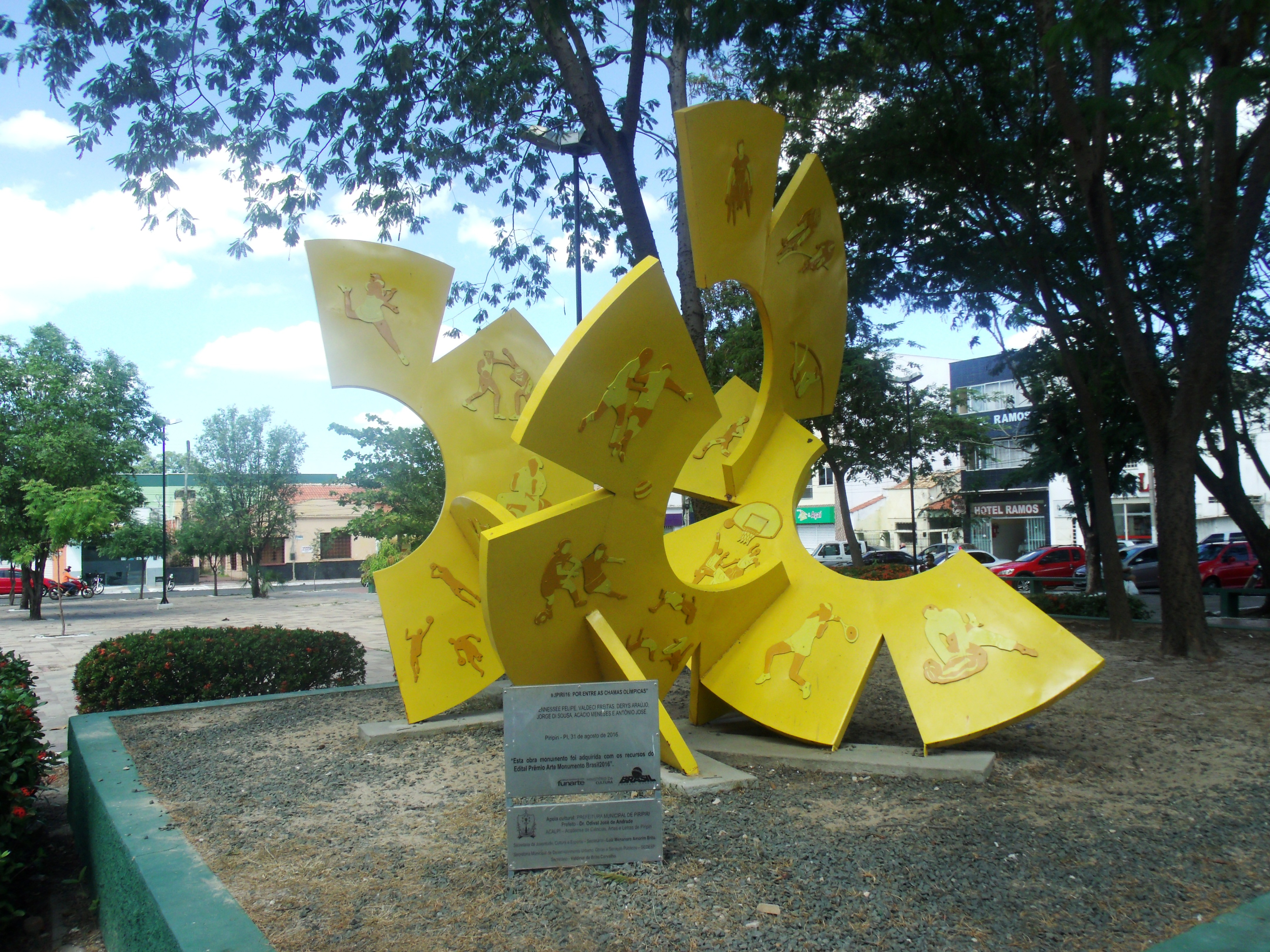
Sculpture in a public square made with Funarte's funding, in Piripiri.

It aims to encourage the training of artists, technicians and producers; the production, practice, development and dissemination of the arts; the development of research; the preservation of memory, and the formation of audiences for the arts in Brazil.

To this end, Funarte grants scholarships and awards, maintains programs for the circulation of artists and cultural goods, promotes workshops, publishes books, recovers and creates collections, provides technical consulting, and supports cultural events in all Brazilian states as well as abroad.

In addition, it maintains cultural spaces in Rio de Janeiro, São Paulo, Minas Gerais, and Distrito Federal, and makes part of its collection available for free on the Internet.

== History ==
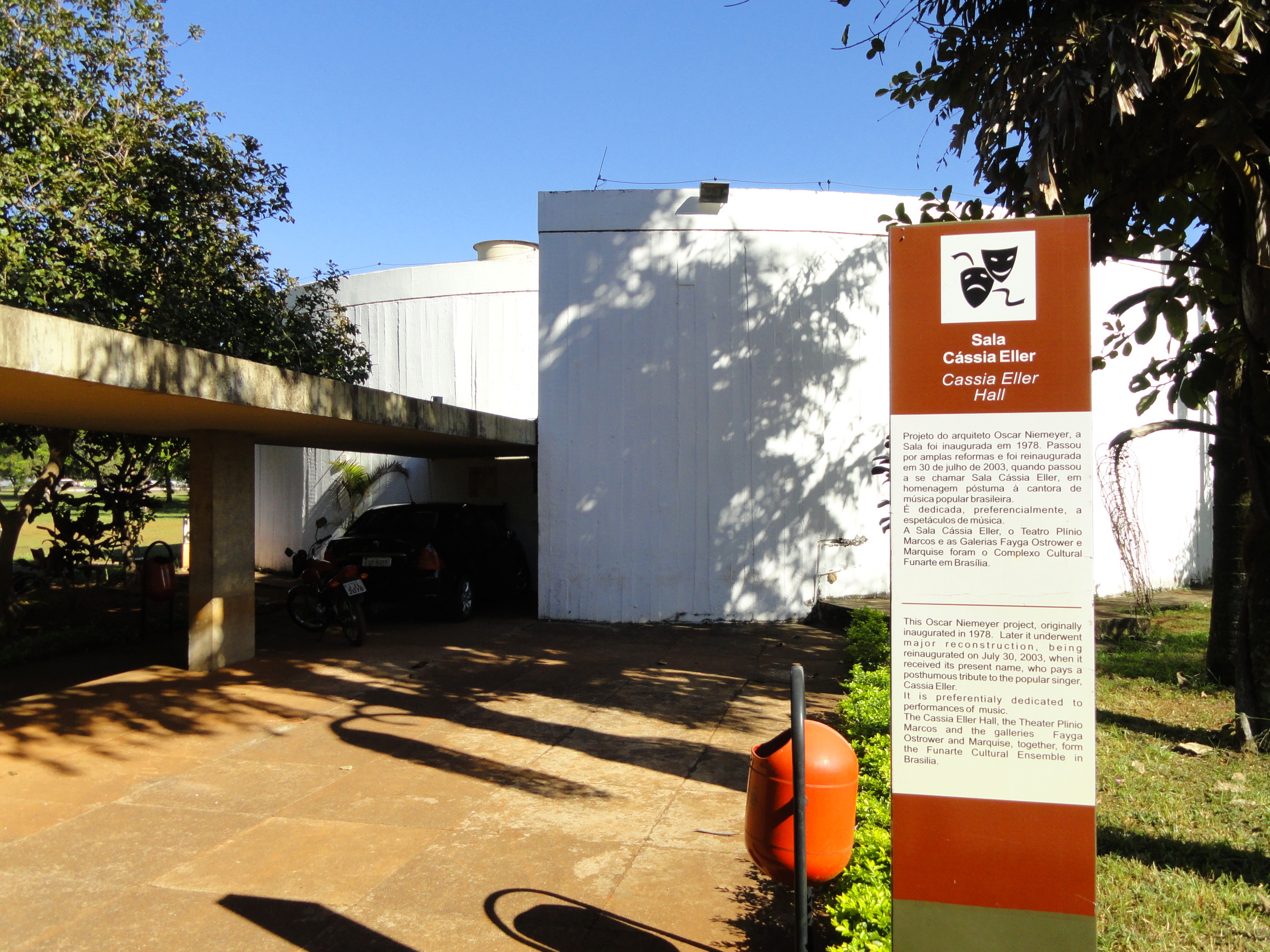
The Cássia Eller Room, music room of the Funarte Cultural Complex in Brasília.

=== The first Funarte ===
It was created in 1975, still during the military dictatorship, by Minister Ney Braga to promote, stimulate, and develop cultural activities throughout Brazil. In the beginning, it was active in music (popular and classical), plastic and visual arts. At the time, it worked together with the National Institute of Folklore (INF), the National Foundation of Scenic Arts (Fundacen), and the Brazilian Cinema Foundation (FCB), all linked to the Ministry of Education and Culture, later renamed to Ministry of Culture.

In 1985, the foundation was chaired by cartoonist Ziraldo. Under the cartoonist's command, Funarte also acted as a syndicate (an agency for the distribution of newspaper strips and pastimes).

=== Original Funarte and second Funarte ===
When Fernando Collor de Mello became president in 1990, he abolished all cultural institutions. In December of that year, he created the Brazilian Institute of Art and Culture (IBAC) - directly linked to the Secretariat of Culture of the Presidency of the Republic, which became a ministry sometime later. IBAC encompassed Funarte, Fundacen, and FCB. With the closing of Funarte, a new distributor of newspaper strips, Pacatatu, emerged.

In 1994, the acronym Funarte replaced the acronym IBAC.

=== Presidents ===
- 1975-1981 - José Cândido de Carvalho.
- 1981-1982 - Aloísio Magalhães.
- 1983-1984 - Edméa Falcão (executive director).
- 1985 - Ziraldo Alves Pinto.
- 1985-1989 - Ewaldo Correia Lima.
- 1989-1990 - Edino Krieger.
- 1990-1992 extinct.
- 1992-1995 - Ferreira Gullar.
- 1995-2002 - Márcio Souza.
- 2003-2007 - Antonio Grassi.
- 2007-2008 - Celso Frateschi.
- 2008-2010 - Sérgio Mamberti.
- 2011-2013 - Antonio Grassi.
- 2013-2015 - Guti Fraga.
- 2015-2016 - Francisco Bosco.
- 2016-2019 - Stepan Nercessian.
- 2019 - Miguel Proença.
- 2019 - Dante Mantovani.
- 2021 - Tamoio Marcondes.
- 2023 - Maria Marighella.
