= Buerarema =

Municipality of Bahia, Brazil

- Municipality
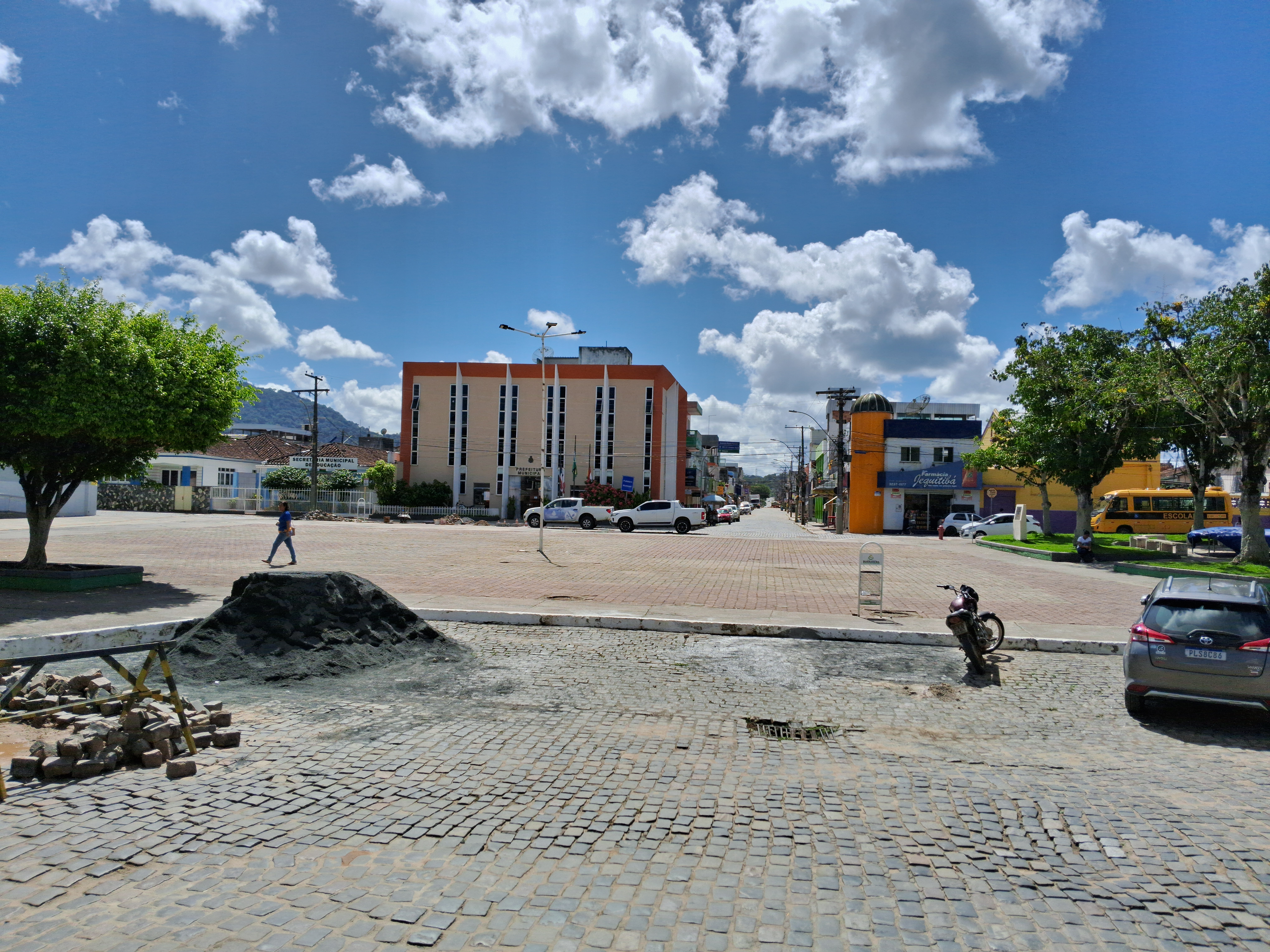
- Square of Buerarema

- Location in Brazil
- Coordinates: 14°57′S 39°19′W
- Country: Brazil
- Region: Nordeste
- State: Bahia

Government
  - Mayor: Vinícius Ibrann Dantas Andrade Oliveira (Brazil Union)

Area
  - Total: 84,744 sq mi (219,487 km^{2})

Population (2021)
  - Total: 18,269
- Time zone: UTC−3 (BRT)

Buerarema is a municipality in the state of Bahia in the North-East region of Brazil. Your mayor is Vinícius Ibrann Dantas Andrade Oliveira.

== See also ==
- List of municipalities in Bahia
