= Tupinambá cape =

17th-century feathered cape

Tupinambá Feather Cape
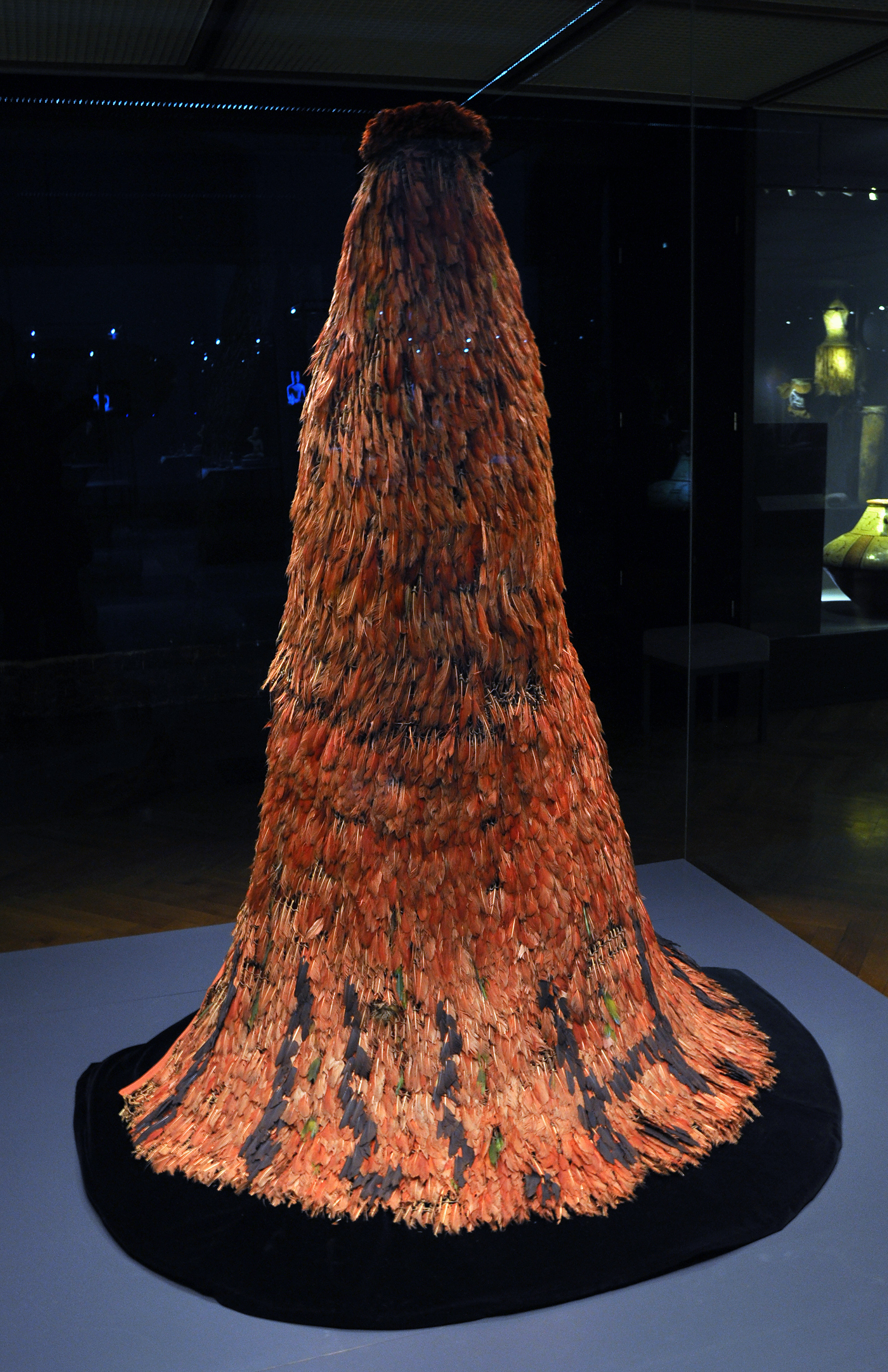
- Year: c.17th century
- Dimensions: 200 cm × 180 cm (79 in × 71 in)
- Location: Musées Royaux d'Art et d'Histoire, Brussels
- Accession: AAM 5783

The Tupinambá cape, mantle, or cloak is a 17th-century feathered cape. It was made by the Tupinambás, an indigenous tribe of the Tupi people, who inhabited modern-day Brazil. It is made of bird feathers and vegetable fibres. The cape is held in the collections of the Musées Royaux d'Art et d'Histoire, Brussels. There are only eleven other Tupinambá capes from the sixteenth and seventeenth centuries extant today. The cape at the Musées Royaux d'Art et d'Histoire is the best preserved.

== History ==
The Tupinambás still inhabit the region before the prior to the arrival of the Portuguese. During the colonial period, Europeans avidly collected Mesoamerican featherwork, often incorporating them into their Cabinets of Curiosities, stunned by the ingenuity of craftsmanship. This influenced manufacture, as seen with the production of featherwork with Catholic motifs in colonial Mexico.

The feather capes of the Tupinambás featured in accounts by European observers in the sixteenth and seventeenth centuries. The French writer André Thevet, living in Brazil during the 1550's, wrote about his experience of these seeing capes:

"There are many birds of diverse kinds, with strange feathers, some as red as fine scarlet, others white, ashy, and other colors. And with these feathers the wild men or Indians, make hats, and garments, either for to cover them[selves] or for beauty. [They use them w]hen they go a warfare [sic] or when they have any skirmish with their enemies."

== Materials ==
=== Featherwork techniques ===
Mesoamerican items manufactured from feathers used three main techniques: they could be tied together into 'long, flowing devices such as headdresses and fans'; glued to solid surfaces, forming mosaics on objects such as shields; or spun and woven into textiles. When tied together, as is seen with the Tupinambá cape, there were several different techniques for knotting the string, which transformed the way they moved and reflected light. When feathers were knotted with a single string they would turn more fluidly, with a second string often added to fix them more firmly in place. Writer and explorer Jean de Léry published his History of a Voyage to the Land of Brazil, Also Called America (1578), describing his experiences living amongst the Tupinambás. He commented on their use of feathers:

"When these feathers have been mixed and combined, and neatly bound to each other with very small pieces of cane and cotton thread (there is no featherworker in France who could handle them better, nor arrange them more skilfully), you would judge that the clothes made of them were a deep-napped velvet."

=== Dyeing feathers ===
A popular technique of colour modification developed, known as tapirage. This involved plucking the green feathers of parrots, rubbing toad's blood on the bird's raw, open pores, and then waiting for new feathers to grow through, which would appear yellow-gold, associating the piece with the divine power of the sun.

== Use ==
The Tupinambá cape was formerly thought to have belonged to the Motecuhzoma II, the ninth Emperor of Mexica, but this view has been discredited. No information as to the provenance of the cape is given in its museum listing.

Birds were sacred creatures within Mesoamerican culture, and the wearer of such capes were imbued with divine qualities. Shamans often wore feather capes, as they aided them in mediating between the living and the dead. This was not a figurative embodiment, but a literal one: transforming the individual into a birdlike creature. Those who took prisoners in battle were reified as eagles, and warriors would wear eagle pelts in order to channel the animal's "distinct prowess".
