= Federal Institute of Bahia =

UNIVERSITY in Salvador, Brazil

Coordinates: 12.9936°S 38.5203°W

Instituto Federal de Educação, Ciência e Tecnologia da Bahia
- Type: Public university
- Established: June 2, 1910 as a School. Turned into IFBA on December 29, 2008.
- Rector: Luzia Matos Mota
- Location: Salvador, Camaçari, Vitória da Conquista, Feira de Santana, Barreiras, Juazeiro, Valença, Bahia, Brazil
- Campus: Urban
- Website: www.ifba.edu.br

The Instituto Federal de Educação, Ciência e Tecnologia da Bahia (acronym: IFBA), in english: Bahia Federal Institute of Education, Science and Technology, is a Brazilian institution that offers higher and vocational education, having a multi-curricular structure with greater emphasis on science, tech and engineering courses. The Institute has many campuses at the Brazilian state of Bahia, each one of those offering professional and technological education in different sub-fields of knowledge.

The Institute is part of the Brazilian public federal education network and is affiliated with the Ministry of Education of Brazil. It has an equivalence, according to law, to the Federal Universities, has large academic autonomy and also develops research projects.

== See also ==
- Federal University of Bahia
- IFET
