= Coyotlinahual =

Aztec god of featherworkers

In Aztec mythology, Coyotlinahual or Coyotl Inahual (Nahuatl for "the coyote is his disguise"; pronounced [ˈkojotɬ iːˈnaːwaɬ]) is the god of featherworkers (amanteca).
