= The Feather Book of Dionisio Minaggio =

Collection of pictures by Dionisio Minaggio

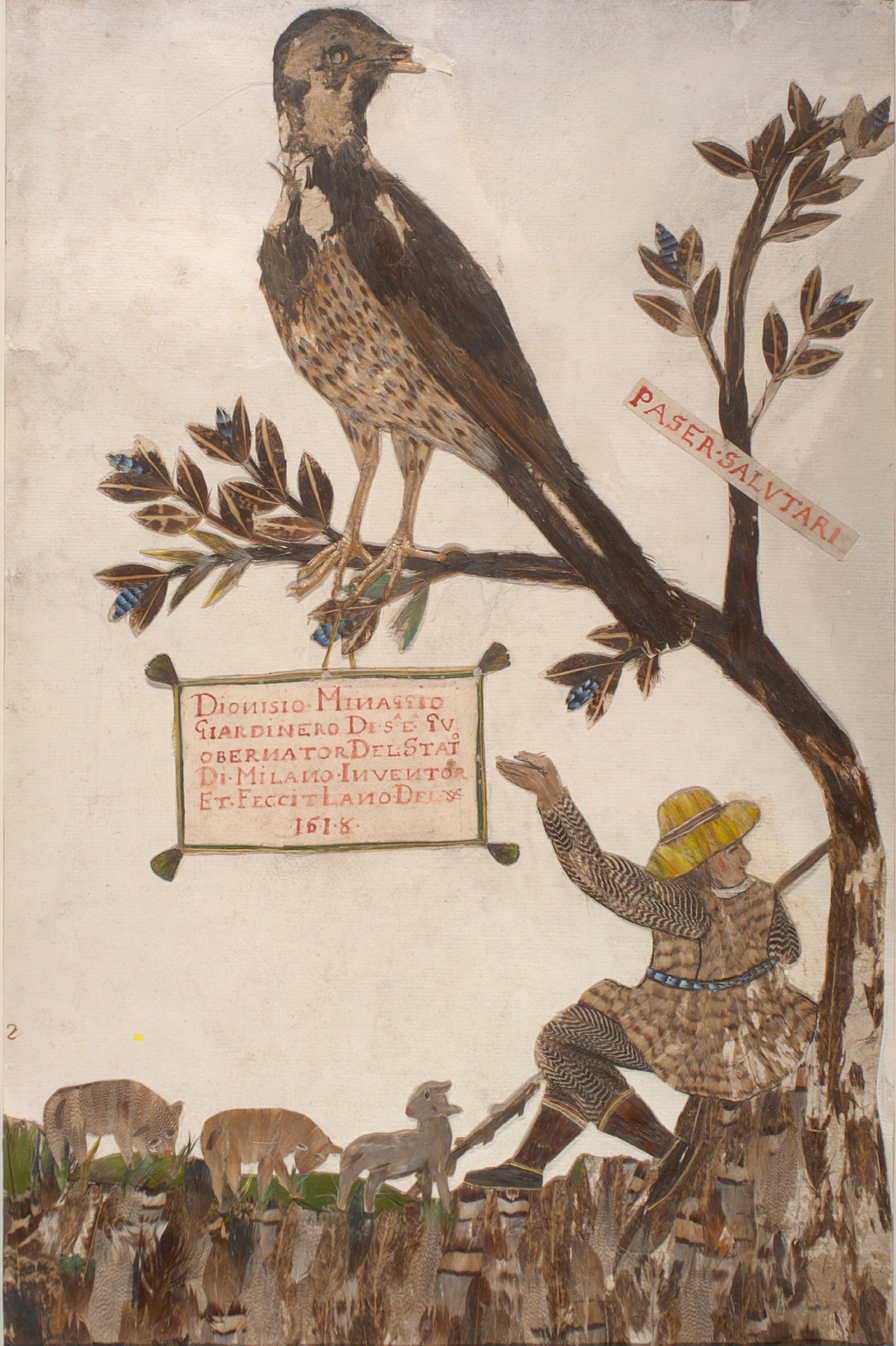
Title page of The Feather Book. The bird depicted is a female blue rock thrush.

The Feather Book of Dionisio Minaggio, also referred to in Italian as Il bestiario barocco (The Baroque Bestiary), is a collection of 156 pictures made almost entirely from bird feathers augmented with pieces of bird skin, feet, and beaks. They were created between 1616 and 1618 by Dionisio Minaggio, the chief gardener of the Duchy of Milan and were originally bound into a book. The majority of pictures in the book are of birds indigenous to the Lombardy region of Italy at the time, but it also contained sets of other images depicting hunters, tradesmen, musicians, and commedia dell'arte characters.

== Subjects ==
There are 156 plates in all, one of which served as the title page. Only Plate 54, a landscape, does not contain any birds or people. Although the images of musicians (Plates 77–84) and commedia dell'arte characters (Plates 100–114) were numbered consecutively, the images of hunters and tradesmen were interspersed amongst those with birds as the central figures.

=== Birds ===
The book contained 113 images with birds as the central figures, including the title page which depicts a female blue rock thrush in a tree with a shepherd beneath it tending his flock. According to Eleanor MacLean, former Librarian of the Blacker-Wood Library of Zoology and Ornithology at McGill University, which now holds the collection, the bird images contain "possibly the oldest preserved bird skins in existence, which makes them of importance taxonomically as well as artistically." The majority of the images show the birds in static profile poses. However some of them depict birds in flight or interacting with people or other birds. There is also a depiction of a woodpecker confronting a snake and another of a woodpecker sticking his tongue into a tree looking for insects. According to MacLean, these represent some of the earliest attempts to illustrate the behaviour of birds in addition to their appearance.

=== Tradesmen and hunters ===
Four tradesmen are depicted in the book—a dentist and his patient, a knife-sharpener, a cobbler and his customer (with a small finch perched in the tree above them), and a chimney sweep (with a Brambling in the tree above). Of the 16 images depicting hunters, the majority are related to bird hunting with several containing birds as part of the scene, notably ducks, an owl, a falcon, and a large unidentified bird standing under a tree. In this latter image (Plate 76) the large bird is being attacked by a hunter on horseback wielding a scimitar. In 1927, the Canadian ornithologist and physician Casey A. Wood proposed that it depicted the dodo which became extinct in the late 17th century, although later work has shown that this was very probably a misinterpretation. There are two images related to boar hunting and one showing a monkey running down a tree as an archer in oriental dress fires an arrow into the trunk. (Plate 51).

=== Commedia dell'arte actors and musicians ===
There are 14 images depicting commedia dell'arte characters, each with their own label. They have been the subject of multiple studies by theatre historians and several of them have been identified as depicting specific actors, probably members of troupes who performed in Milan at the time the book was made. The first of the 13 images (Plate 100) depicts Leander, an innamorato character, famously played by Benedetto Ricci of the Fedeli troupe. However, in addition to his character label, the title "Lichomezi" (Milanese dialect for "Comedians") appears at the top of the page suggesting that these images were meant to be a set.

Of the eight musician images, two depict men playing the violin. The remainder depict the cornett, harp, cello, archlute, mandolin, and bagpipes. According to theatre historian M.A. Katritzky, they may well have depicted the musicians who accompanied the visiting Commedia dell'arte troupes.
