= Moctezuma's headdress =

Aztec featherwork headdress

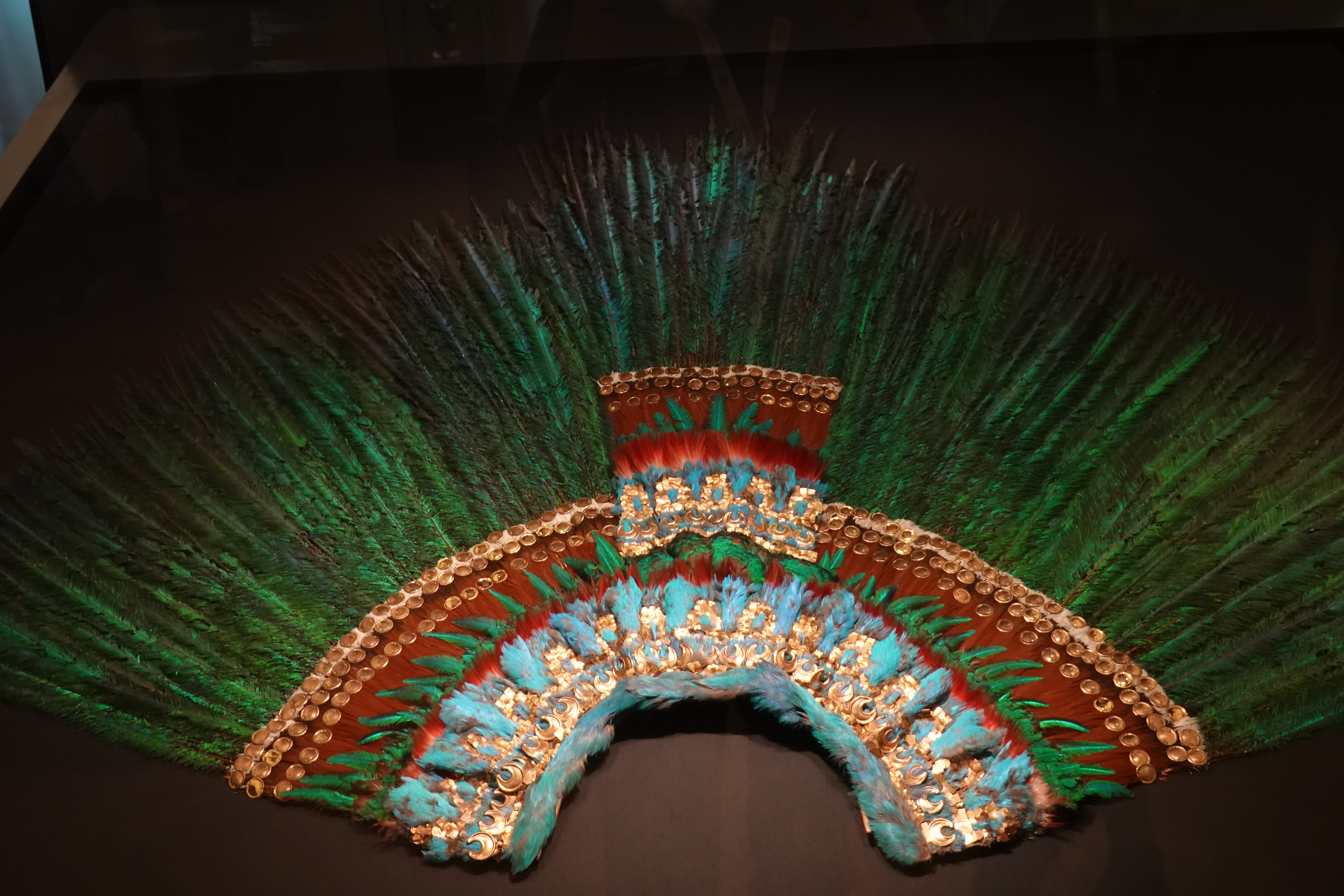
- Material: Feathers of quetzal, Lovely cotinga, Roseate spoonbill, Piaya cayana, gold
- Size: 116 cm (46 in) high, 175 cm (69 in) diameter
- Present location: Museum of Ethnology, Vienna, Austria
- Identification: 10402VO

Moctezuma's headdress is a historical artifact that has been long disputed in terms of origin, patron, and function. The object's function was perhaps featherwork headdress or military symbol. In the Nahuatl languages, it is known as a quetzalāpanecayōtl (ketsalaːpaneˈkajoːtɬ). There is a tradition that it belonged to Moctezuma II, the Aztec emperor at the time of the Spanish conquest. The provenance of the headdresses remains uncertain, and even its identity as a headdress has been questioned. It is made of quetzal and other feathers with sewn-on gold detailing. The object has been in private Austrian collections since the end of the sixteenth century and is now in the Weltmuseum (World Museum) in Vienna, Austria and remains an issue of dispute between Austria and Mexico, as Mexico has asked for the return of the object.

== Terminology ==
In Mexico, Moctezuma's headdress is sometimes referred to as El Penacho de Moctezuma (Moctezuma's Headdress). The word “penacho” is defined as feathers on top of a helmet. Penacho featherwork was traditionally used in indigenous cultures, including the Mexica, where intricate feathered pieces were used ceremonially and symbolic of status or power. There is no known evidence that proves the headdress belonged to Moctezuma II. However, it is recognized to have been a symbol of political and religious power in ancient Mexico and similar headdresses appear in Mexica monuments as part of the ritual belongings. This one is made primarily of quetzal and blue cotinga feathers.

== Possible function ==
There have been many interpretations of the artifact's original function. Some earlier theories proposed the headdress to be a fan, an apron, or even a mantle. Scholars have suggested that the headdress derived its name from the traditional story of the meeting between Motecuhzoma and Hernán Cortés where he presumably gave the Conquistador diplomatic gifts of headdresses, gold and silver, and clothes to please Emperor Charles V. Harvard art historian, Khadija von Zinnenburg Carroll, discusses the fact that there were many Mexica rulers throughout history who never wore the same crown twice, and so if there is only one crown left in existence, there is a very slim chance of actually knowing to whom it originally belonged.

Some scholars have proposed that this kind of feather headdress was probably used as a military insignia instead of a crown. As such, the headdress, made of feathers, gold, wood, and vegetable fibers, would have been placed on a bamboo stick and positioned on a distinguished soldier’s back. Esther Pasztory has suggested that there is evidence that headdresses, such as this piece, were part of the Mexica royalty for ritualistic purposes, especially to be worn when impersonating the god Quetzalcoatl. Davíd Carrasco and Eduadro Matos Moctezuma have written that according to reports, Moctezuma II had a special devotion and reverence for ceremonies, especially the New Fire Ceremony (Toxiuhmolpilia).

The object's identification as a quetzalapanecayotl (a quetzal bird feather headdress) is attributed to American anthropologist Zelia Nuttall in her research paper "Standard or Head-dress?". Nuttall put forth the theory that the objects represent a quetzal bird with its wings extended, tail pointing upwards, and head pointing downwards. Furthermore, Esther Pasztory has claimed that a model of a headdress or a crown used by Motecuhzoma was depicted in the Codex Mendoza, a traditional Mexica manuscript. This interpretation, linking the artifact to Moctezuma II directly, prompted the claim for its return to Mexico.

== Mexica cultural significance ==
In Mexica folklore, Moctezuma II is often remembered not only as a ruler but as a figure whose reign marked the coinciding of divine prophecy and political power. His association with Quetzalcoatl, the feathered serpent deity, imbues the headdress with a layer of religious and cultural symbolism. The headdress, crafted with the feathers of sacred birds is a powerful emblem of this connection. In the 20th century, the headdress gained increasing importance as a symbol of Mexico’s indigenous heritage. During this time, it was reinterpreted as an "indigenist" icon that represents the grandeur of the Mexica Empire, aligning with Mexico’s efforts to establish a unique cultural identity distinct from its colonial past. This nationalistic interpretation also influenced the calls for the artifact to be repatriated to Mexico.

=== Danza de los Quetzales ===
The Danza de los Quetzales was an ancient dance that originated from the legend of the quetzal, a mythological bird of Mesoamerica that was then considered by the Mexicas to be sacred and symbolic of the essence of beauty and elegance. Moctezuma's headdress is told to have been formed from twenty four feathers captured at great peril from the long tails of the quetzals. In the city of Puebla, located in central Mexico during the time of the Mexica Empire, performers trained for many months to personify the bird and illustrate the dignity, godliness, and grace that the Mexicas attribute to it. There exists an idea that this was the home town of Moctemuza's headdress. It is not impossible, as the Mexica Empire exerted significant influence over the broader central Mexican region, including Puebla.

== Provenance ==
In the late nineteenth century, Austria established its first Museum of Natural History, with geologist Ferdinand von Hochstetter as its director. While searching for objects to display in the new museum, von Hochstetter found the headdress in Ambras Castle, Archduke Ferdinand’s former residence in Innsbruck, Austria. At the beginning of the 19th century, it was deposited in Vienna along with other ceremonial artifacts of Quetzalcoatl and Ehecatl. Since 1928 it belongs to the Museum of Ethnology (inventory number 10402VO).

Although artifact exchanges and restitution of the headdress were negotiated with the Mexican government, a bilateral expert commission deemed the artifact too fragile for transport due to its significant reaction to heat and movement, and thus recommended its remaining in Vienna. In 2020, the Mexican government asked again for the restitution of the headdress, however it still resides in Vienna today.

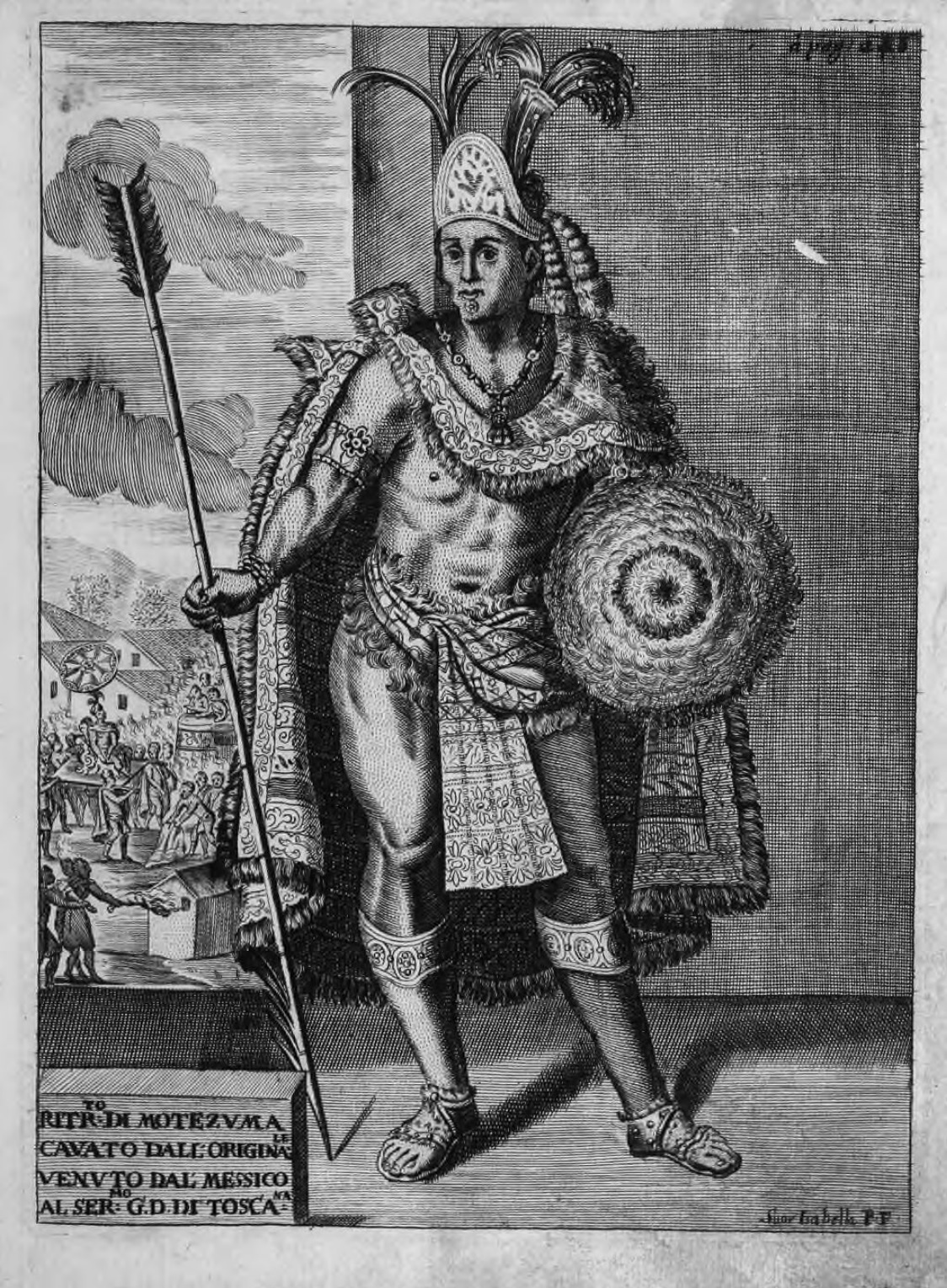
Late 17th-century portrayal of Moctezuma II, wearing a xiuhhuitzolli, which was the royal crown used by Mexica emperors.

== Description ==
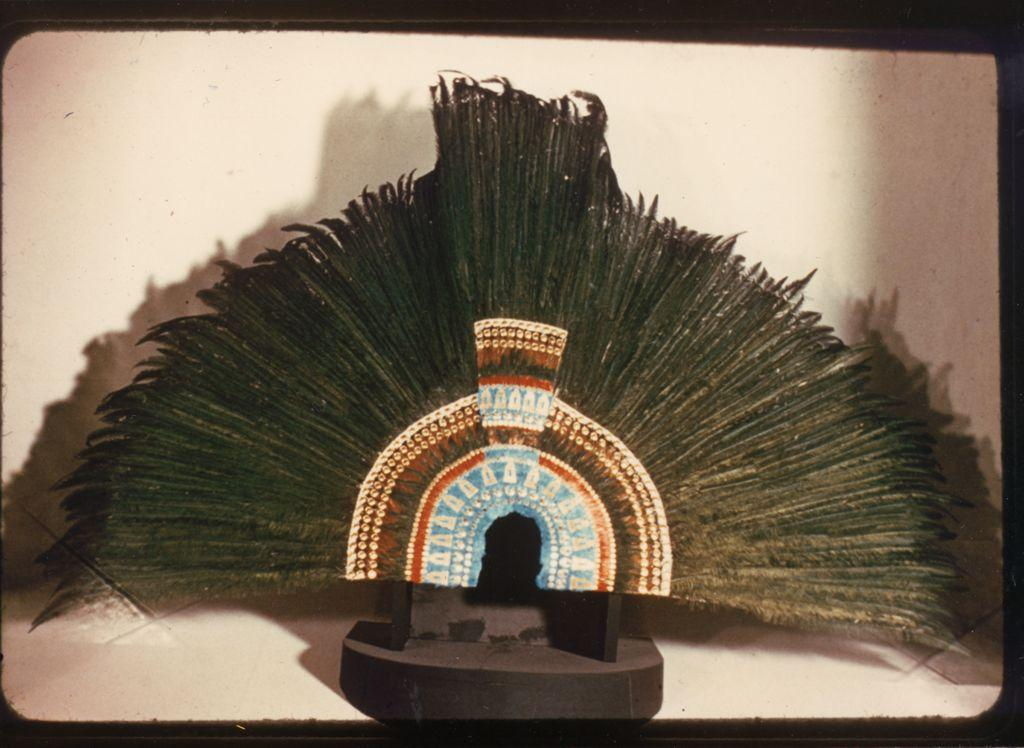
A headdress made of quetzal feathers, popularly referred to as Montezuma II's crown.

Moctezuma's headdress measures 130 by 178 centimeters. It includes the green uppertail coverts of the quetzal bird, the turquoise feathers of the cotinga, brown feathers from the squirrel cuckoo, pink feathers from the roseate spoonbill, and small ornaments of gold.

This artifact is in the form of concentric layers of different colored feathers arranged in a semicircle. The smallest layer is made from blue feathers of the Cotinga amabilis (xiuhtōtōtl) with small plates of gold in the shapes of half moons. Behind this layer is another a layer of Roseate spoonbill (tlāuhquechōlli) feathers, followed by small quetzal feathers, then a layer of white-tipped red-brown feathers of the squirrel cuckoo, Piaya cayana, with three bands of small gold plates, and finally two layers of 400 closely spaced quetzal (pharomachrus mocinno) tail feathers, some 55 cm (22 in) long. The quetzal feathers in the center of the headdress are raised relative to the sides. Leather straps attach the crown to the head of the wearer.

The feathers of the original headdress have deteriorated over the centuries. The headdress is made almost entirely out of organic materials that are susceptible to environmental conditions. It remains intact but is quite fragile. The feathers have experienced natural deterioration over the centuries, as well as the gold detailing and gold fibers.

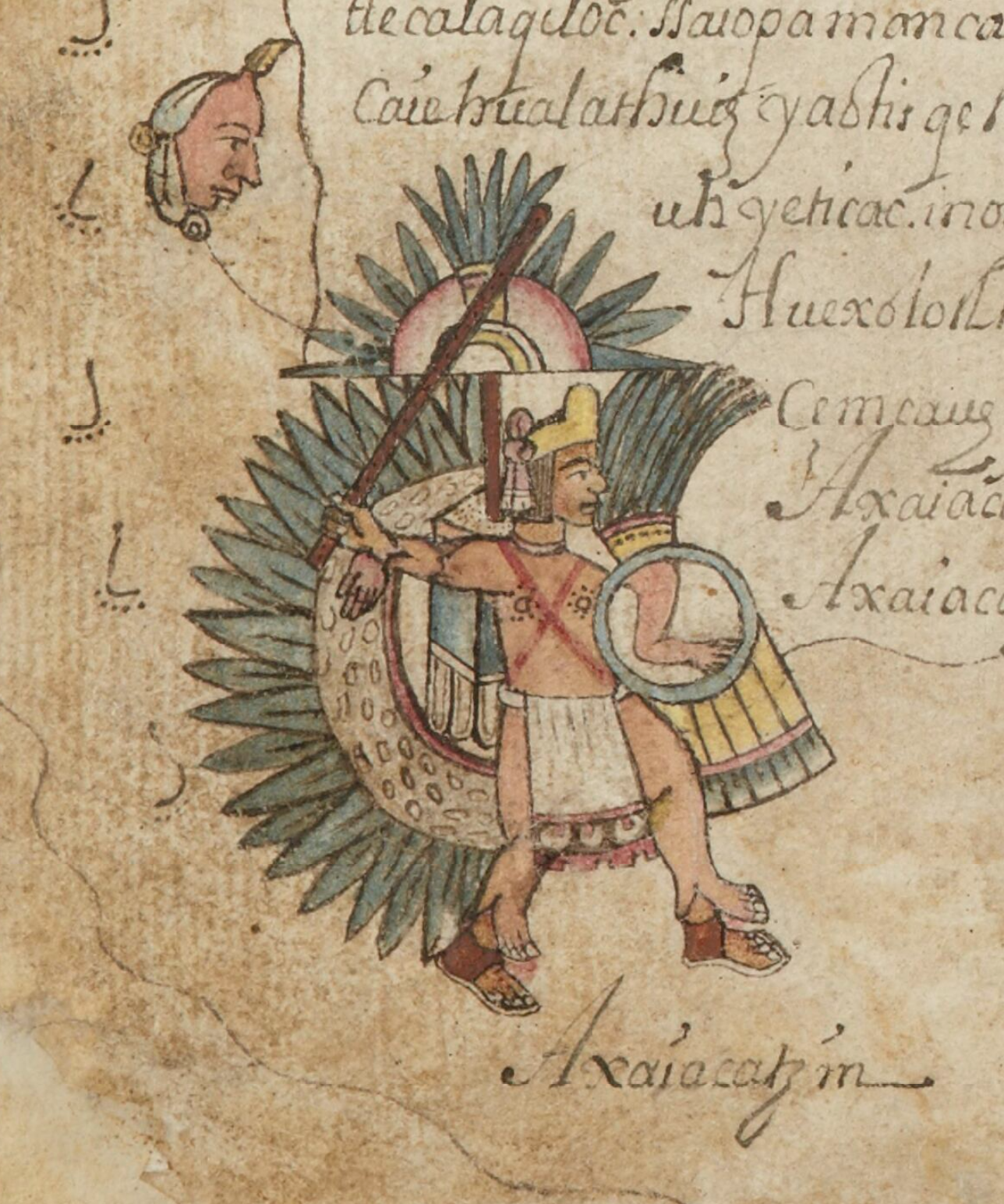
Depiction in Codex Cozcatzin of emperor Axayácatl wearing a battle standard and back device with a similar appearance to the apparent headdress.

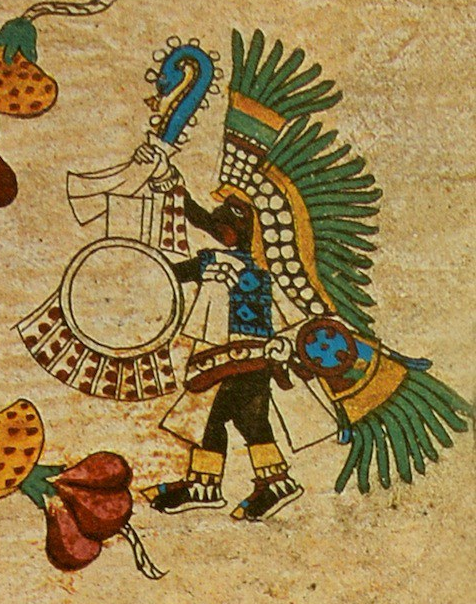
Detail of Codex Borbonicus showing a dancer with a similar headdress during the festival of Xocotlhuetzi.

Though it likely served as a headdress, it has also been identified in other ways. As a headdress, its appearance matches that which is seen in contemporary Aztec codices being worn by priests during the festival of Xocotlhuetzi. However, its appearance also matches that of other kinds of objects also seen in contemporary depictions. In Codex Cozcatzin, emperor Axayácatl is depicted during the Battle of Tlatelolco wearing a quetzal-feathered battle standard and some sort of large device in the back, both of which have a similar appearance. In all situations, it appears that the object is associated with the deity Quetzalcoatl. Regardless, there is no direct evidence which suggests that it actually belonged to Moctezuma.

=== Replica ===
In 1940, a replica was made specifically for display in Mexico City. The replica is currently displayed at the National Museum of Anthropology in Mexico City, serving as a symbol of Mexico's Aztec heritage, allowing visitors to connect with an essential part of Aztec history while discussions about repatriation continue.

== Repatriation dispute between Mexico and Austria ==
Efforts to identify the origins and cultural significance of the headdress have continued over the years. Scholars and researchers have debated its provenance, questioning whether it was truly owned by "Moctezuma II" or served a broader ceremonial purpose in Aztec society. The headdress, made of vibrant "Resplendent quetzal" feathers and adorned with gold, is considered a masterpiece of Mesoamerican craftsmanship. Furthermore, the headdress remains a focal point of cultural heritage discussions, with Mexico frequently advocating for its return as part of ongoing repatriation dialogues. These debates highlight the broader issues of colonial-era artifact displacement and the ethical considerations surrounding their modern-day ownership and display.

Between 1992 and 2002, repeated protests by indigenous Mexica activists in Vienna demanded the return of the headdress. The leading figure in these protests was an Aztec activist named Xokonoschtletl Gómora (Spanish name Antonio Gomora) who advocated for the artifact's repatriation. The demonstrations escalated to the point that, in 1992, the police had to secure the entrance of the Museum of Ethnology. Xokonoschtletl contacted parliamentarians in Mexico and Austria, carried out media campaigns, and even allegedly brought the case to the United Nations and the Pope. Some scholars argue that it was him who put the case to return the artifact into motion. One of the official motives for wanting to return it was the recognition of the fact that Mexico had protested against Hitler’s annexation of Austria in 1938.

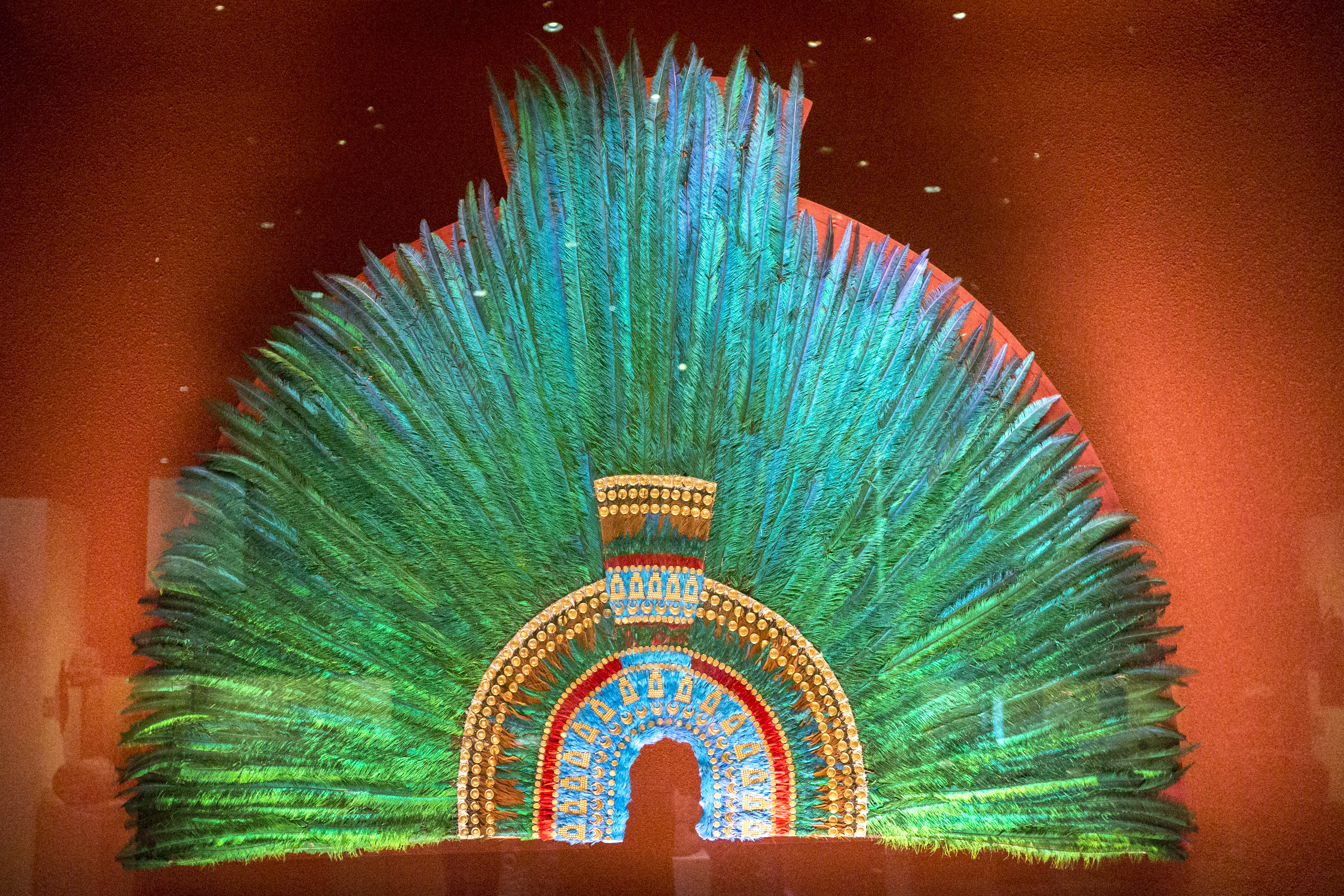
Modern reproduction of Moctezuma's headdress, in the Museo Nacional de Antropología e Historia, Mexico City

=== Assessing preservation and transport feasibility ===
In 2010, Mexico and Austria launched a research initiative to assess the condition of the headdress and explore the feasibility of loaning it to Mexico. The study involved cleaning the artifact and examining methods to mitigate vibrations that could harm it during transit. The findings determined that the headdress was too delicate to be transported. The conclusion of the study has played a significant role in shaping discussions around the ownership of headdress's future. While the artifact remains in Austria, the research project fostered a deeper collaboration between Mexican and Austrian experts, leading to advancements in conservation techniques. It also reignited debates over the ethical and cultural implications of retaining such artifacts outside their countries of origin. Despite the logistical challenges, Mexico continues to advocate for innovative solutions, such as virtual repatriation or temporary exhibitions within the framework of strict preservation protocols, to make the headdress accessible to its people.

== See also ==
- Xokonoschtletl Gómora — Mexican activist who has struggled for the return of Moctezuma's headdress.
