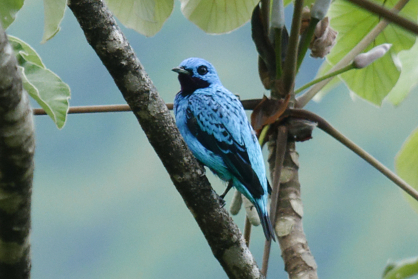

Conservation status
- Vulnerable (IUCN 3.1)

Scientific classification
- Kingdom: Animalia
- Phylum: Chordata
- Class: Aves
- Order: Passeriformes
- Family: Cotingidae
- Genus: Cotinga
- Species: C. ridgwayi

Binomial name
- Cotinga ridgwayi Ridgway, 1887

= Turquoise cotinga =

Species of bird

The turquoise cotinga or Ridgway's cotinga (Cotinga ridgwayi) is a Vulnerable species of bird in the family Cotingidae. It is found in Costa Rica and Panama.

== Taxonomy and systematics ==
The turquoise cotinga is monotypic. It, the lovely cotinga (C. amabilis), and the blue cotinga (C. nattererii) form a superspecies. The plum-throated (C. maynana), purple-breasted (C. cotinga), and banded (C. maculata) cotingas may also be part of that clade.

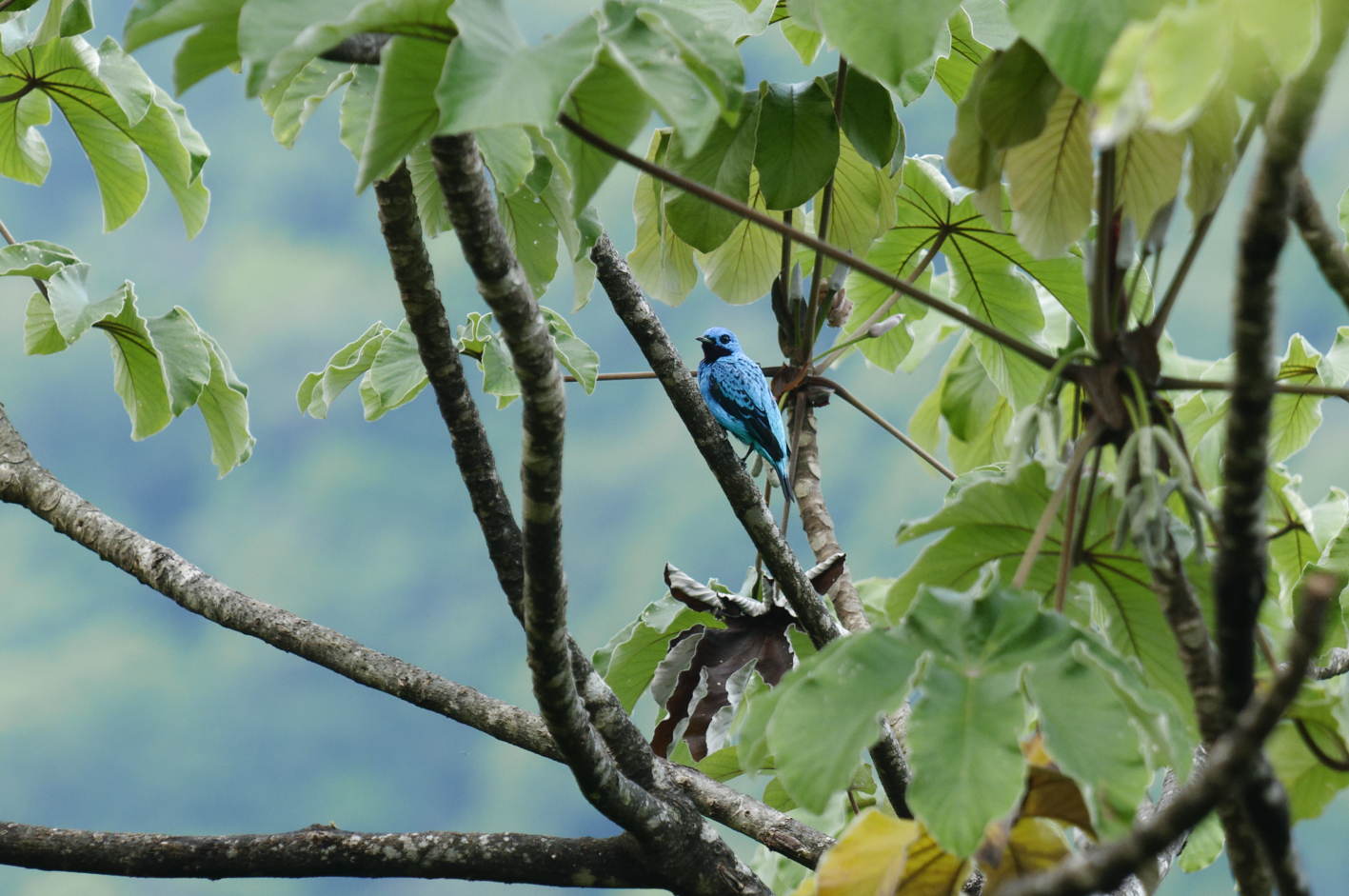

== Description ==
The turquoise cotinga is 17 to 18.5 cm (6.7 to 7.3 in) long and weighs about 51 to 66 g (1.8 to 2.3 oz). The sexes are dramatically dimorphic. Adult males have deep turquoise-blue upperparts. Their wings are black with thin to moderately wide blue edges on most feathers. Their tail is black; their turquoise-blue uppertail coverts are long and cover much of the tail. Their chin and throat and separately their breast and upper belly are purple. Adult females are larger than males. They have mostly dark brown upperparts with buffish white feather tips that produce a scalloped appearance. Their wings are mostly dusky brown with buffish white scallops on most coverts and cinnamon edges on the tertials. Their tail is dusky brown. Their underparts are mostly pale buff with grayish brown spots but their undertail coverts are unspotted. Both sexes have a dark brown iris and dark gray to blackish legs and feet. Their short wide bill has a black maxilla with a grayish base and a gray mandible with a black tip. Immature birds are similar to adult females but with buff edges on the flight feathers.

== Distribution and habitat ==
The turquoise cotinga is found from the southern Gulf of Nicoya in west-central Costa Rica south along the Pacific slope into western Chiriquí Province in far western Panama. It inhabits the tropical zone where it is found in the interior of humid evergreen forest and secondary woodland. In Panama it occurs mostly below 900 m (3,000 ft) but reaches 1,800 m (5,900 ft) in Costa Rica..

== Behavior ==
=== Movement ===
The turquoise cotinga is believed to be a year-round resident but may make some irregular movements in response to fruit availability.

=== Feeding ===
The turquoise cotinga apparently feeds only on fruits; those of trees, Loranthaceae mistletoes, and Phytolacca pokeweed are known. Its foraging behavior has not been documented though it appears to be mostly a canopy dweller.

=== Breeding ===
The turquoise cotinga's one known nest held two eggs in March. It was a shallow cup made from plant fibers and strands of fungus, placed in a fork of a horizontal branch about 9 m (30 ft) above the ground in an isolated tree. The full nesting season, incubation period, time to fledging, and details of parental care are not known.

=== Vocal and non-vocal sounds ===
The turquoise cotinga is usually silent, but females make "a raucous shriek" distress call. Males' wings make a "soft twittering" sound in flight.

== Status ==
The IUCN originally in 1988 assessed the turquoise cotinga as Threatened and since 1994 as Vulnerable. It has a restricted range and its estimated population of between 1250 and 2820 mature individuals is believed to be decreasing. "Agricultural conversion has resulted in near-complete deforestation in its Panamanian range. Forests within the range in Costa Rica are inadequately protected and similarly at risk of clearance." It is considered uncommon in Costa Rica. The most recent records in Costa Rica came from Las Cruces and Las Alturas Biological Stations, Carara National Park, and the Osa Peninsula (including Corcovado National Park). Panamanian records come from the Santa Clara area and at El Chorogo.
