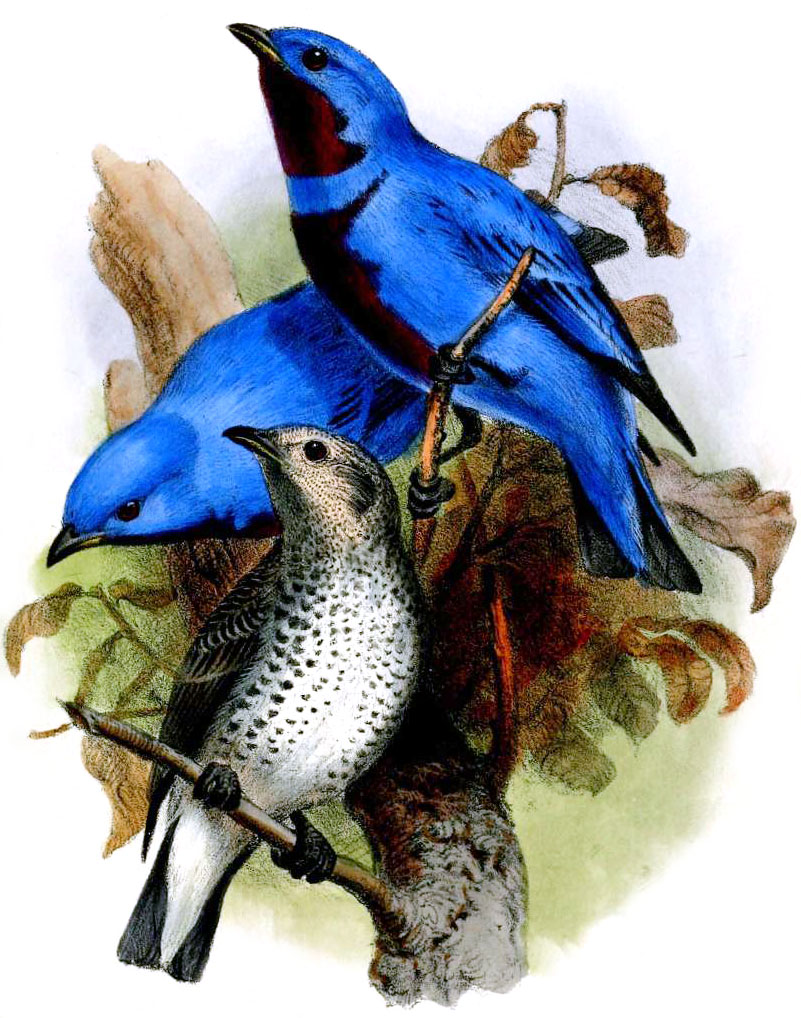
- Illustration by Joseph Wolf

Conservation status
- Least Concern (IUCN 3.1)

Scientific classification
- Kingdom: Animalia
- Phylum: Chordata
- Class: Aves
- Order: Passeriformes
- Family: Cotingidae
- Genus: Cotinga
- Species: C. amabilis

Binomial name
- Cotinga amabilis Gould, 1857

= Lovely cotinga =

Species of bird

The lovely cotinga (Cotinga amabilis) is a species of bird in the family Cotingidae. It is found in Mexico and every Central American country except El Salvador.

== Taxonomy and systematics ==
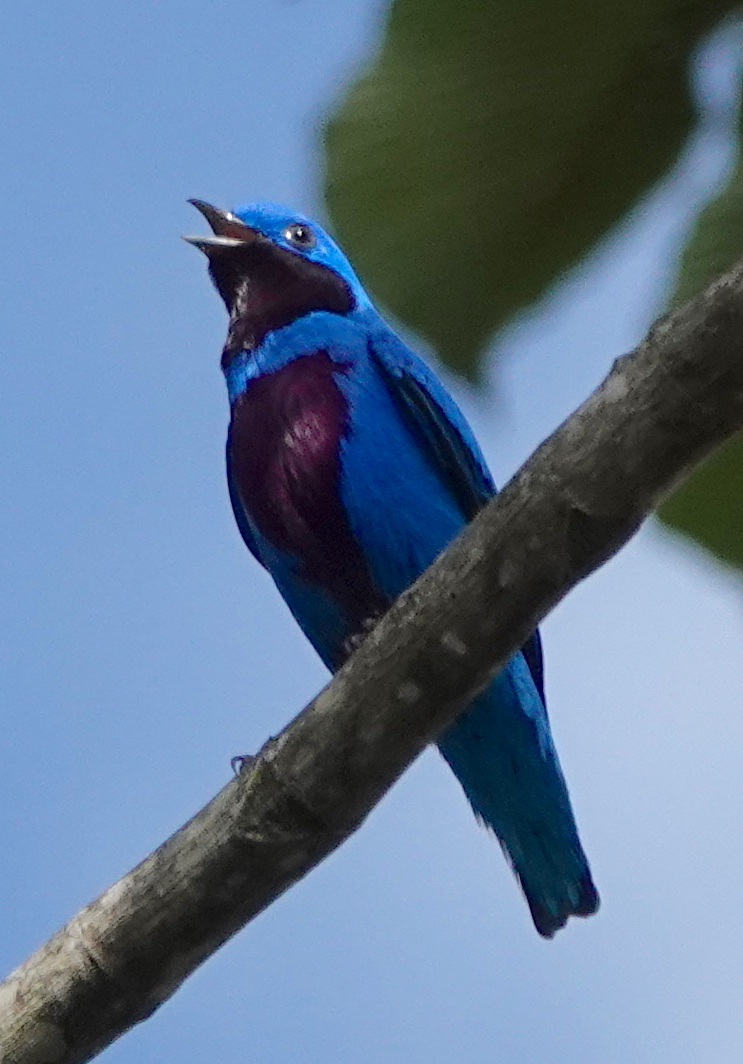
Live bird

The lovely cotinga is monotypic. It, the turquoise cotinga (C. ridgwayi), and the blue cotinga (C. nattererii) form a superspecies. The plum-throated (C. maynana), purple-breasted (C. cotinga), and banded (C. maculata) cotingas may also be part of that clade.

== Description ==
The lovely cotinga is 18 to 20 cm (7.1 to 7.9 in) long and weighs 66 to 75 g (2.3 to 2.6 oz). The sexes are dramatically dimorphic. Adult males have rich bright blue upperparts whose color is slightly deeper on the crown. Their wings' lesser and median coverts are the same bright blue. Their greater coverts, primaries, secondaries, and tertials are black with blue or greenish blue edges. Their tail is black with greenish blue or bluish green edges on the feathers; the uppertail coverts are long and cover the base of the tail. The lower part of their face is glossy purplish black and their chin, throat, and upper breast are dark purple. Their lower breast, flanks, and undertail coverts are the same rich bright blue as their upperparts but for an oval patch of rich purple on the belly. Adult females have mostly dark grayish brown upperparts with whitish feather tips that produce a scalloped appearance. Their wings are mostly dusky grayish brown with usually a greenish tinge on the lesser and median coverts. Their greater coverts and flight feathers have pale grayish brown or buffy edges. Their tail is dusky grayish brown with thin green or greenish gray feather edges. Their underparts are mostly dull white with dusky grayish brown spots that are heaviest on the breast and sides and diminish elsewhere. Both sexes have a dark brown iris, a short, wide, gray to black bill, and gray to black legs and feet. Immature birds are similar to adult females but with cinnamon-buff edges on the wing feathers.

== Distribution and habitat ==
The lovely cotinga is found in southern Mexico from southern Veracruz across northern Oaxaca and Chiapas south of the Yucatán Peninsula. Its range continues south along the Caribbean through southern Belize and northern Guatemala and northern Honduras and further inland on the Caribbean slope through Nicaragua and Costa Rica. There are also sight records in Panama and on the Pacific side of Costa Rica. It inhabits the tropical zone, where it is found in the interior and edges of lowland evergreen forest and also more open areas with scattered trees. In elevation it ranges from sea level to 1,500 m (4,900 ft) in Mexico and northern Central America and reaches 1,700 m (5,600 ft) in Costa Rica.

== Behavior ==
=== Movement ===
The lovely cotinga is believed to be a year-round resident but may make some seasonal movements.

=== Feeding ===
The lovely cotinga's diet is not well known, but is thought to be primarily fruits and also includes invertebrates and occasionally small vertebrates like lizards. It typically forages singly or in pairs but "larger numbers may congregate in fruiting trees". It forages mostly in the canopy, where it perches in the open on bare branches and makes short sallies to pluck fruit or insects.

=== Breeding ===
Little is known about the lovely cotinga's breeding biology. One nest was found in the canopy about 30 m (100 ft) above the ground and another was about half way up a 20 m (65 ft) pine tree. Their construction could not be determined. In the one instance when parental care was observed, the female provisioned a flightless nestling that had apparently fallen to the ground.

=== Vocal and non-vocal sounds ===
The lovely cotinga is generally silent but males are thought to give "high-pitched metallic notes". In flight the species' wings make "dry fluttering rattles". As of late September 2025 xeno-canto had one recording of lovely cotinga vocalizations and two of the wing rattle. The Cornell Lab's Macaulay Library had the same vocalization recording and six others of vocals or wing noises.

== Status ==
The IUCN has assessed the lovely cotinga as being of Least Concern. It has a large range; its estimated population of between 20,000 and 50,000 mature individuals is believed to be decreasing. No immediate threats have been identified. It is considered rare in northern Central America and Costa Rica. Mexican authorities classify it as threatened. "The primary threat to Lovely Cotinga is conversion of its forested habitat for agriculture and livestock grazing. Although these trends have not been quantified, populations of Lovely Cotinga have declined, probably significantly, throughout its range, as a result of deforestation."
