= Weltmuseum Wien =

Anthropological museum in Austria

Coordinates: 48°12′18″N 16°21′48″E

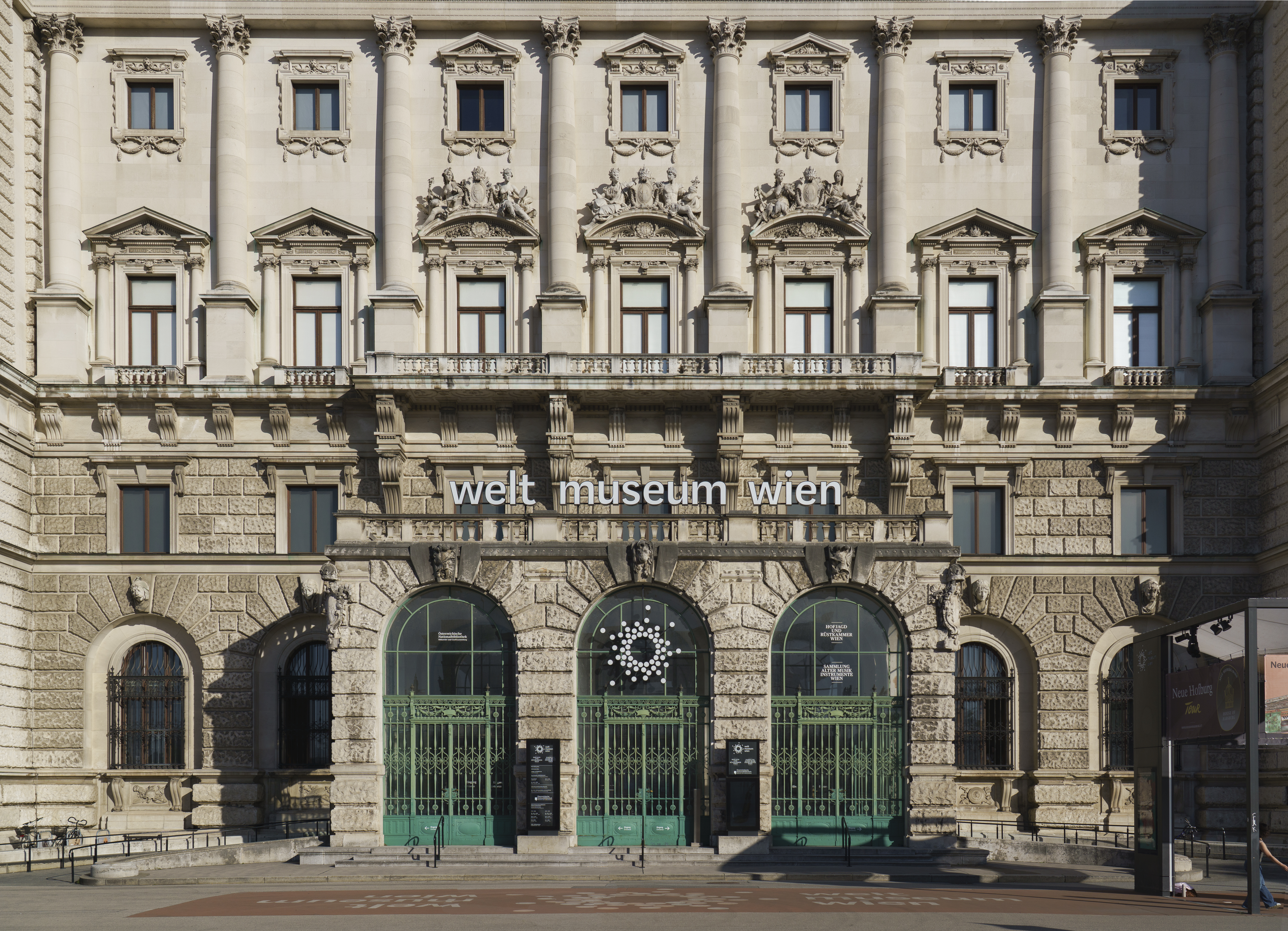
The museum entrance

The Weltmuseum (translating to World Museum) in Vienna is the largest anthropological museum in Austria, established in 1876. It is housed in a wing of the Hofburg Imperial Palace and holds a collection of more than 400,000 ethnographical and archaeological objects from Asia, Africa, Oceania, and America.

Until 2013, it was known as the Museum of Ethnology, German: Museum für Völkerkunde). Before 1928, the Anthropological-Ethnographic Department belonged to the Natural History Museum.

== Collections ==
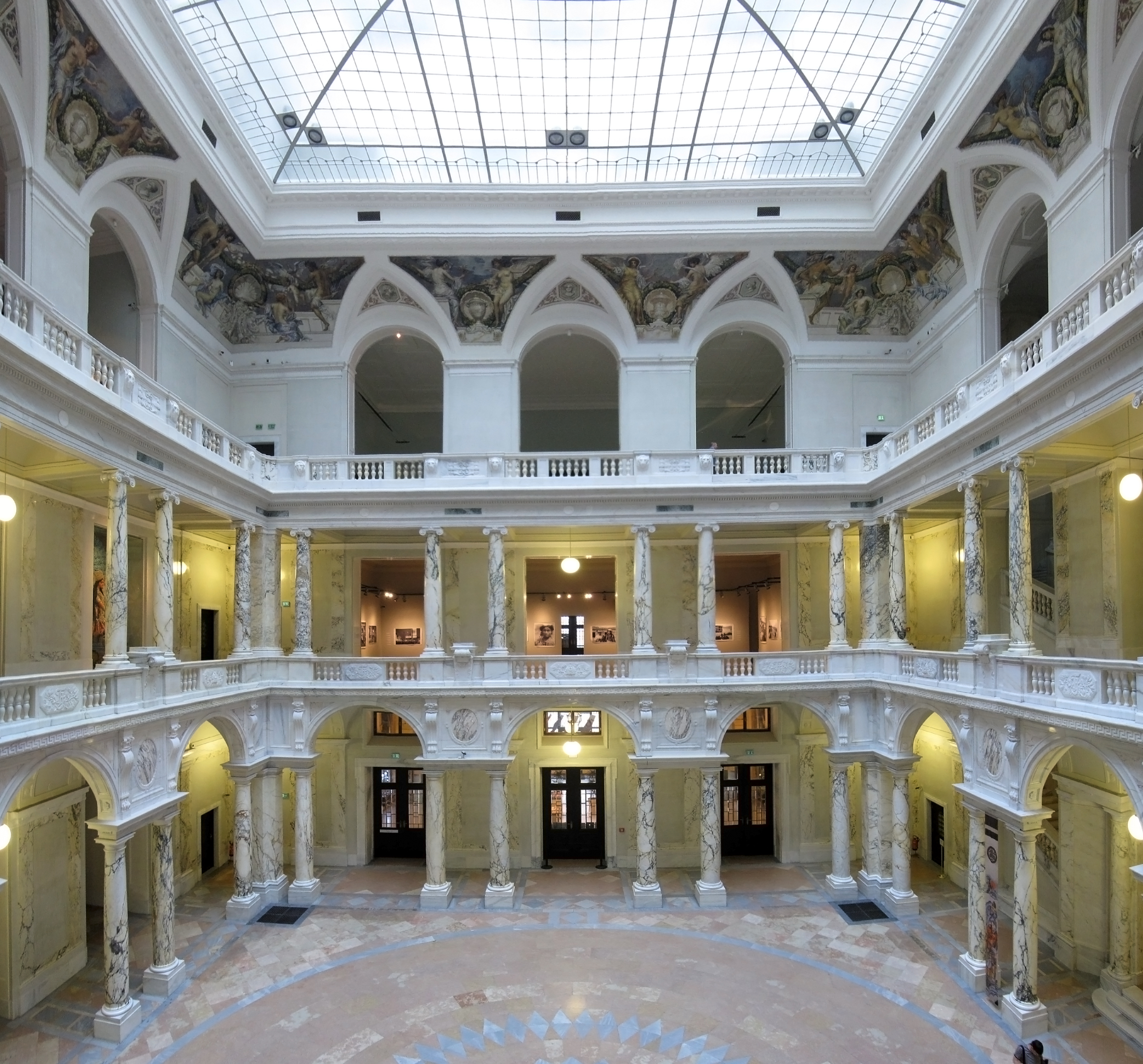
Interior view of the museum

The museum's collections comprise more than 200,000 ethnographic objects, 100,000 photographs and 146,000 printed works from all over the world. Important collections include Mexican artifacts, such as a unique Aztec feathered headdress, part of James Cook's collection of Polynesian and Northwest Coast art (purchased in 1806), numerous Benin Bronzes, the collection of Charles von Hügel from India, Southeast Asia, and China, collections from the Austrian Brazil Expedition, artifacts collected during the circumnavigation of the globe by the SMS Novara, and two of the remaining rongorongo tablets.

The museum's most famous piece is a feathered headdress which tradition holds belonged to Moctezuma II, the Aztec emperor at the time of the Spanish Conquest. This has created friction between the Mexican and the Austrian governments. Originally taken as war booty by the Spanish in the 16th century, Austria acquired it from France in 1880.

=== Departments ===
- Sub-Saharan Africa
- North Africa, Middle East, Central Asia and Siberia
- East Asia: China, Korea, Japan
- Insular Southeast Asia
- South Asia, Southeast Asia, Himalayas
- Oceania and Australia
- North and Central America
- South America
- Photo Collection

== History ==
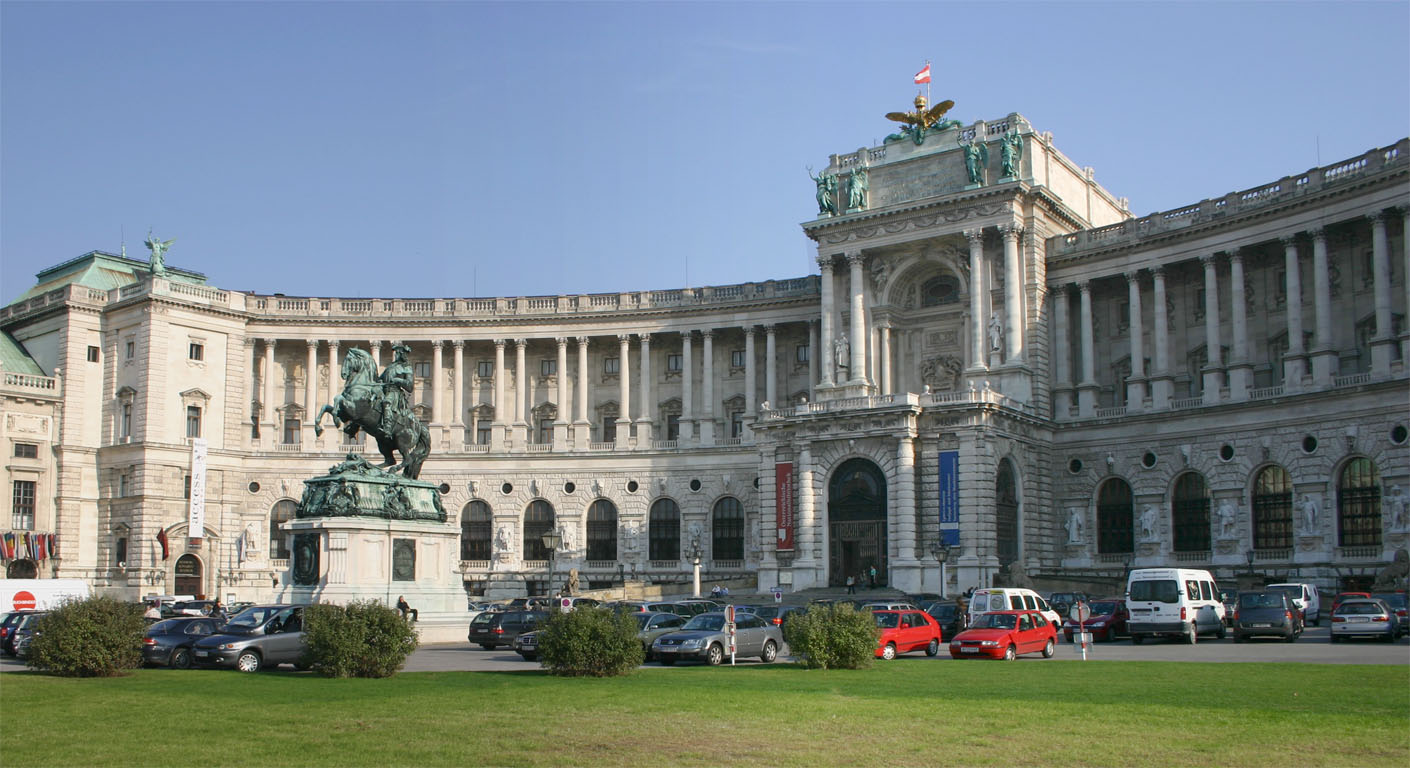
The Weltmuseum Wien is housed in a wing of the Hofburg Imperial Palace

=== Ethnographic collections in Austria before 1876 ===
Early ethnographic collections in Austria date back to the 16th century. The so-called “Kunst- und Wunderkammern“ comprised many objects, such as the collection by Ferdinand II, Archduke of Austria, which was stored in Ambras Castle in Innsbruck. In the course of the Coalition Wars these objects were transferred to Vienna. Other important collections were assembled by numerous explorers and travellers, such as Johann Natterer, who accompanied the Austrian Brazil Expedition from 1817 to 1835, or the scientists of the Austrian frigate ”SMS Novara”

=== Imperial and Royal Court Museum of Natural History and the Museum of Ethnology ===
In 1876, the Imperial and Royal Court Museum of Natural History – predecessor of the Museum of Ethnology – was established, consisting of five departments. In the years following Archduke Franz Ferdinand of Austria’s journey round the world (1892/93), the collections of the Anthropological-Ethnographic Department were separated from the museum and installed in the Hofburg Imperial Palace and combined with the Archduke’s collection, which comprised more than 14,000 objects and around 1,100 photographs. This “Museum of Ethnology” was opened on 28 May 1928. In the post-World War II period, extensive reconstruction works were undertaken. The museum also presented numerous temporary exhibitions at two permanent outposts – Schloss Matzen and the Gaming Charterhouse.

=== From Museum of Ethnology to Weltmuseum ===
In the 1990s and the early years of the new millennium, a comprehensive renovation of the Museum of Ethnology became necessary. Amongst other things, the cellars were adapted for storage, galleries were renovated and additional office rooms were built. In the course of the semi-privatisation of Austria's federal museums, the museum was incorporated into the museum group KHM-Museumsverband in 2001. In April 2013, the museum was renamed as Weltmuseum Wien.

In November 2014, the museum closed for renovation and, in February 2015, the ground-breaking ceremony took place. On 25 October 2017, the museum officially opened with an opening show at Heldenplatz conceived by André Heller. The event featured international artists and was attended by the Austrian Federal President, Alexander Van der Bellen, as well as directors Wes Anderson and Michael Haneke and actress Tilda Swinton. Around 7,500 visitors were present, and in the days that followed, thousands more came to see the newly opened museum.

== See also ==
- Xokonoschtletl Gómora — Mexican activist who struggled for the return of Montezuma's headdress housed at the museum.
