= Xokonoschtletl Gómora =

Mexica dancer, author, and activist in Austria and Germany

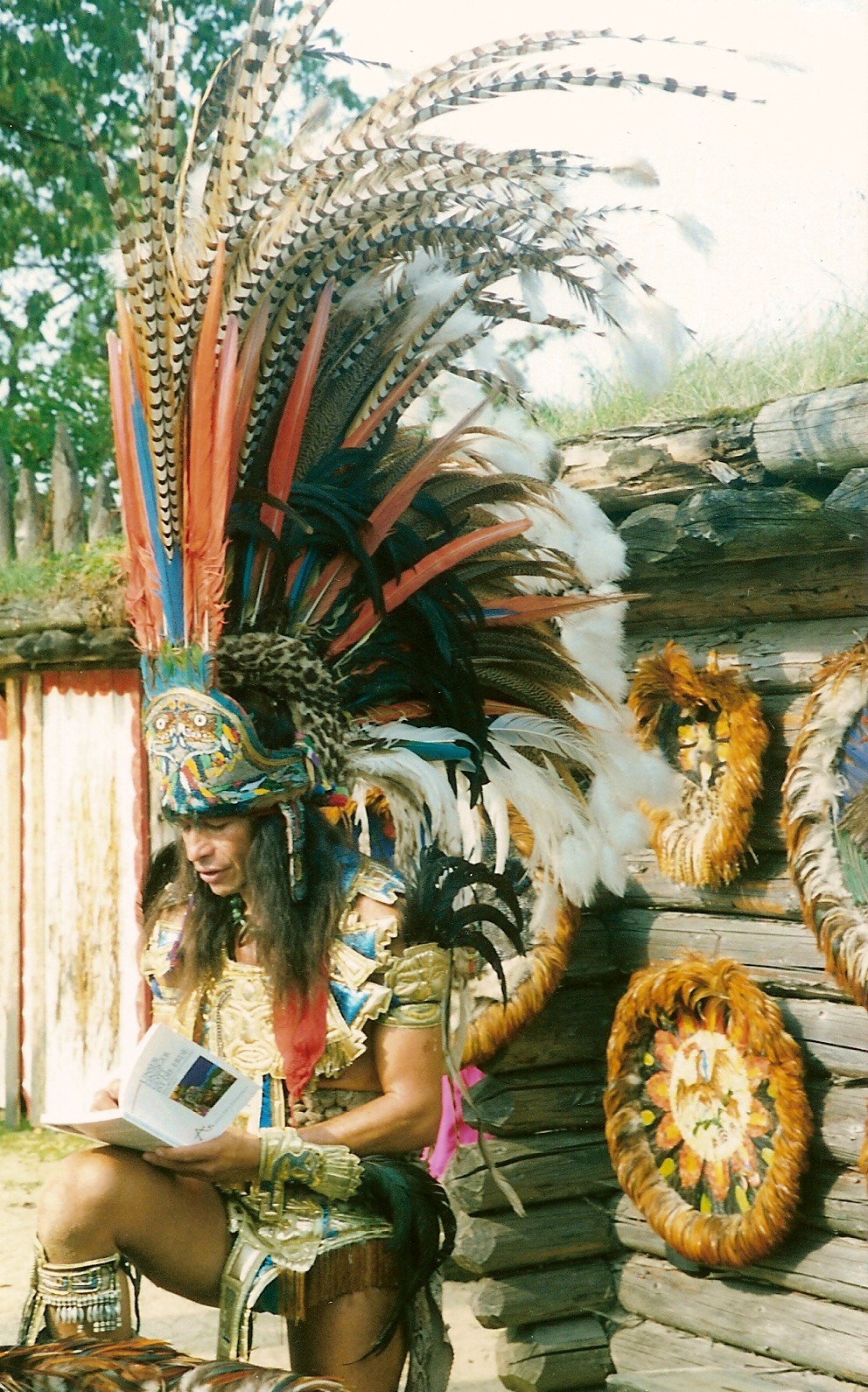
- Xokonoschtletl Gómora signs his book "Our Only God is the Earth" in 2008.
- Born: February 17, 1951 (age 74); Mexico City, Mexico
- Occupations: Activist; Dancer; Writer

Xokonoschtletl Gómora (Nahuatl: [ʃokoˈnost͡ʃt͡ɬet͡ɬ]; born 17 February 1951, in Mexico City, Mexico) is a Mexican dancer who performs Pre-Hispanic traditional music, a writer, lecturer, and civic activist. He was commissioned by the United Nations for the Frente Mexicano Pro Derechos Humanos (English: Mexican Front for Human Rights) to promote the protection of Mexican cultural heritage. He is best known for leading the Asociación Civil Internacional Yankuik Anahuak (International Civil Association of the People of the Valley of Mexico) and because for over thirty years he has pushed for the return of a quetzal feather headdress (Nahuatl: quetzalpanecáyotl) known as Montezuma's headdress currently located in the Vienna Museum of Ethnology (German: Weltmuseum Wien).

== Activities ==
Xokonoschtletl began working as a tourist guide and became involved with indigenous activists who promoted the protection of traditional Mexican culture. He later founded the Asociación Civil Yankuik Anahuak (International Civil Association People of the Valley of Mexico), through which he has struggled for thirty years, without financial support from the government, for the return of a quetzalpanecáyotl (quetzal feather headdress) known as Montezuma's headdress housed at the Vienna Museum of Ethnology (Museum für Völkerkunde). Apart from quetzal feathers, the headdress is ornamented with gold and precious stones, and "is considered the most valuable Mexican relic that is abroad", Xokonoschtletl is also a member of the Frente Mexicano Pro Derechos Humanos (Mexican Front for Human Rights) and its representative to the United Nations. He considers it very important that the plume be brought back to Mexico because it "is part of [Mexico's] identity and national culture". As part of this movement, every year since 1986, he organizes a march that goes from the UN offices in Vienna, to the Houses of Parliament, as well as artistic and cultural events.

Over the years, his request has been supported by the Instituto Nacional de Antropología e Historia (INAH, National Institute of Anthropology and History), by Thomas Klestil and Heinz Fischer when they were president of Austria. He was also supported by Austrian legislators. The members of the Social Democratic Party of Austria, led by Peter Schieder (chairman of the parliamentary committee of Foreign Policy), presented a proposal to return the headdress in 2005. In this initiative, they said that it would be a token of gratitude for the Mexican people, because Mexico was the first country to show their support to Austria in 1938, protesting against its annexation to Nazi Germany. In 2009, legislators of the Communist Party of Austria presented a new initiative with a similar proposal. In Mexico, the movement has been supported by the deputy Jorge Triana, National Action Party member, and Rafael Elias Sanchez of the Party of the Democratic Revolution.

Xokonoschtletl is the official spokesman of the Consejo Mundial de Pueblos Indígenas (World Council of Indigenous Peoples), and participates in civic activism, promoting the protection of cultural heritage and the support of ethnic minorities and disadvantaged people. His Pre-Hispanic traditional dance music group, called Ometoetl has presented several shows in Germany, as "La danza del venado" (Deer Dance). He is a lecturer and writer as well. Among his works, written in Spanish, are: Lo que nos susurra el viento: la sabiduría de los aztecas (1998), Sentémonos al fuego: cuentos y relatos de la tradición azteca (1998) and Juicio a España Testigos Aztecas (2007).

== Works ==
Among his published works are:

=== Works in German ===
- Bist Du Mexikaner? (1987) ISBN 3-926876-00-X.
- Unser einziger Gott ist die Erde : Weg, Weisheit und Geschichte der Azteken (1996) ISBN 3-591-08268-6.
- Medizin der Mutter Erde : die alten Heilweisen der Indianer (1996) ISBN 3-576-10547-6.
- Was der Wind uns singt : indianische Weisheiten (1996) ISBN 3-576-10691-X.
- Setzt euch zu uns ans Feuer : indianische Märchen für Erwachsene (1997) ISBN 3-576-11042-9.
- Xokonoschtletl : Wir sind ein Teil der Natur : Indianische Lebensphilosophie (edición en video) ISBN 3-89672-443-6.

=== Works in Spanish ===
- Lo que nos susurra el viento: la sabiduría de los aztecas (1998) ISBN 9789681103019.
- Sentémonos al fuego: cuentos y relatos de la tradición azteca (1998) ISBN 9788401011573.
- Juicio a España Testigos Aztecas (2007) ISBN 9789709758672.

=== CDs ===
- Die Sonne des Jaguar. John Silver Production, Berlín 2001. "Una colección de mitos indígenas, leyendas e historias de México".
- Der Tanz der Rehe. Video/CD, Orpheus-Musiktheater Ostfildern.
