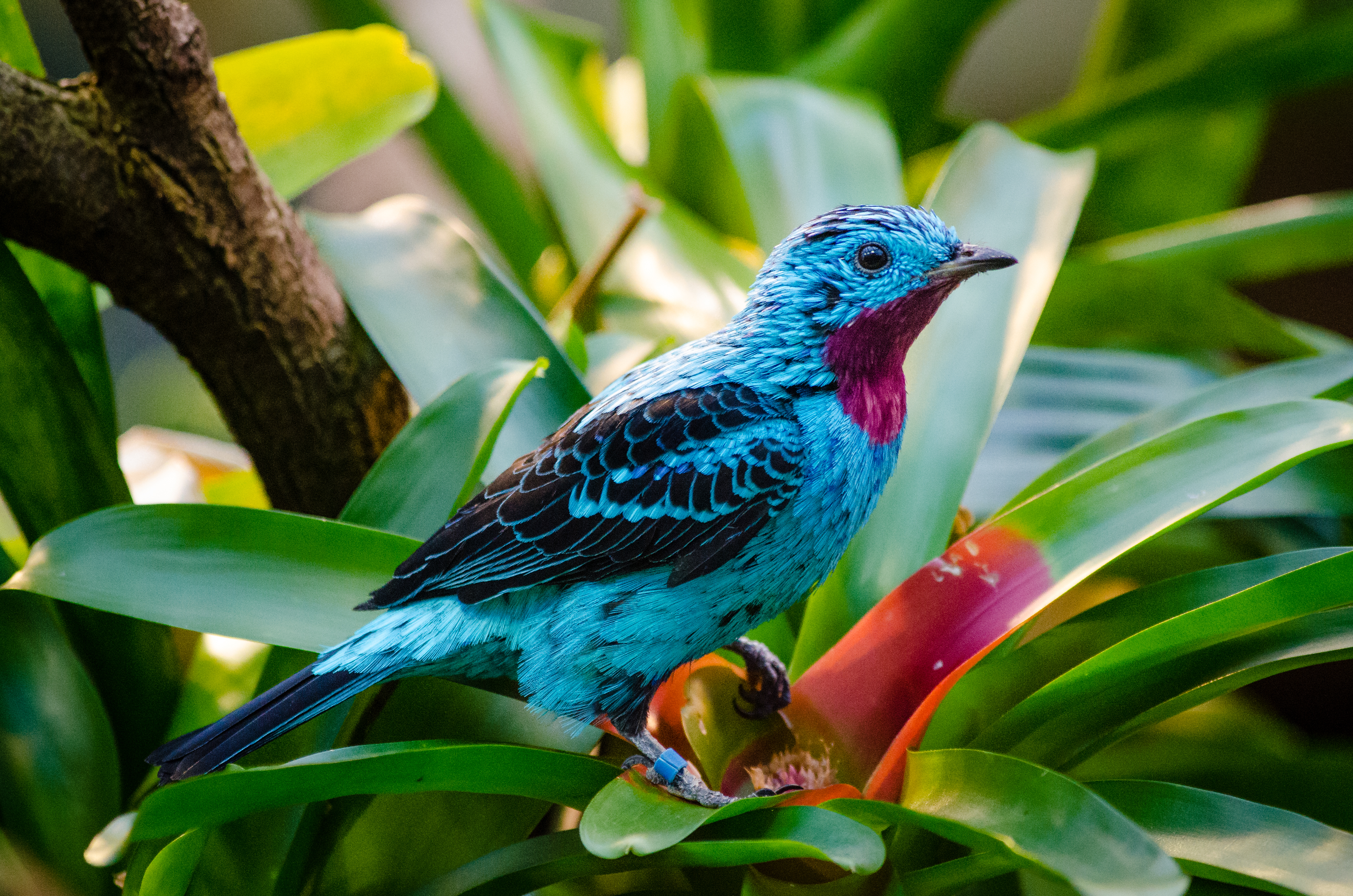
- Spangled cotinga (Cotinga cayana)

Scientific classification
- Kingdom: Animalia
- Phylum: Chordata
- Class: Aves
- Order: Passeriformes
- Family: Cotingidae
- Genus: Cotinga; Brisson, 1760

Type species
- Ampelis cotinga Linnaeus, 1766

Species
- 7, see text.

= Cotinga (genus) =

Genus of birds

Cotinga is a genus of passerine birds belonging to the cotinga family, Cotingidae. It contains seven species that are found in tropical rainforest in South and Central America from southern Mexico to south-east Brazil. They feed mainly on fruit and forage high in trees.

They are 18–22 cm (7.1–8.7 in) long. The males have highly colourful plumage; bright blue with areas of purple. The blue colour is produced by air bubbles in the feathers which scatter light. Females are much duller than males and are mainly brown, often with pale feather edges giving them a scaled or speckled appearance.

The wings of the males make a whistling or rattling noise in flight.

Deforestation is a threat to several members of this genus. The turquoise cotinga is classed as Vulnerable by the IUCN and the banded cotinga is considered to be Critically Endangered.

== Taxonomy ==
The genus Cotinga was introduced by the French zoologist Mathurin Jacques Brisson in 1760. The type species is the purple-breasted cotinga. The name is from the extinct Tupi language for a "bright forest bird".

The genus contains seven species:

| Image | Name | Common name | Distribution |
|---|---|---|---|
| | Cotinga amabilis | Lovely cotinga | southern Mexico and Central America |
| | Cotinga ridgwayi | Turquoise cotinga | southern Costa Rica and western Panama |
| | Cotinga nattererii | Blue cotinga | Tumbes-Chocó-Magdalena |
| | Cotinga maynana | Plum-throated cotinga | western Amazon basin |
| | Cotinga cotinga | Purple-breasted cotinga | Amazon basin & Guianas |
| | Cotinga maculata | Banded cotinga | mid-Atlantic Forest |
| | Cotinga cayana | Spangled cotinga | Amazon basin & Guianas |
