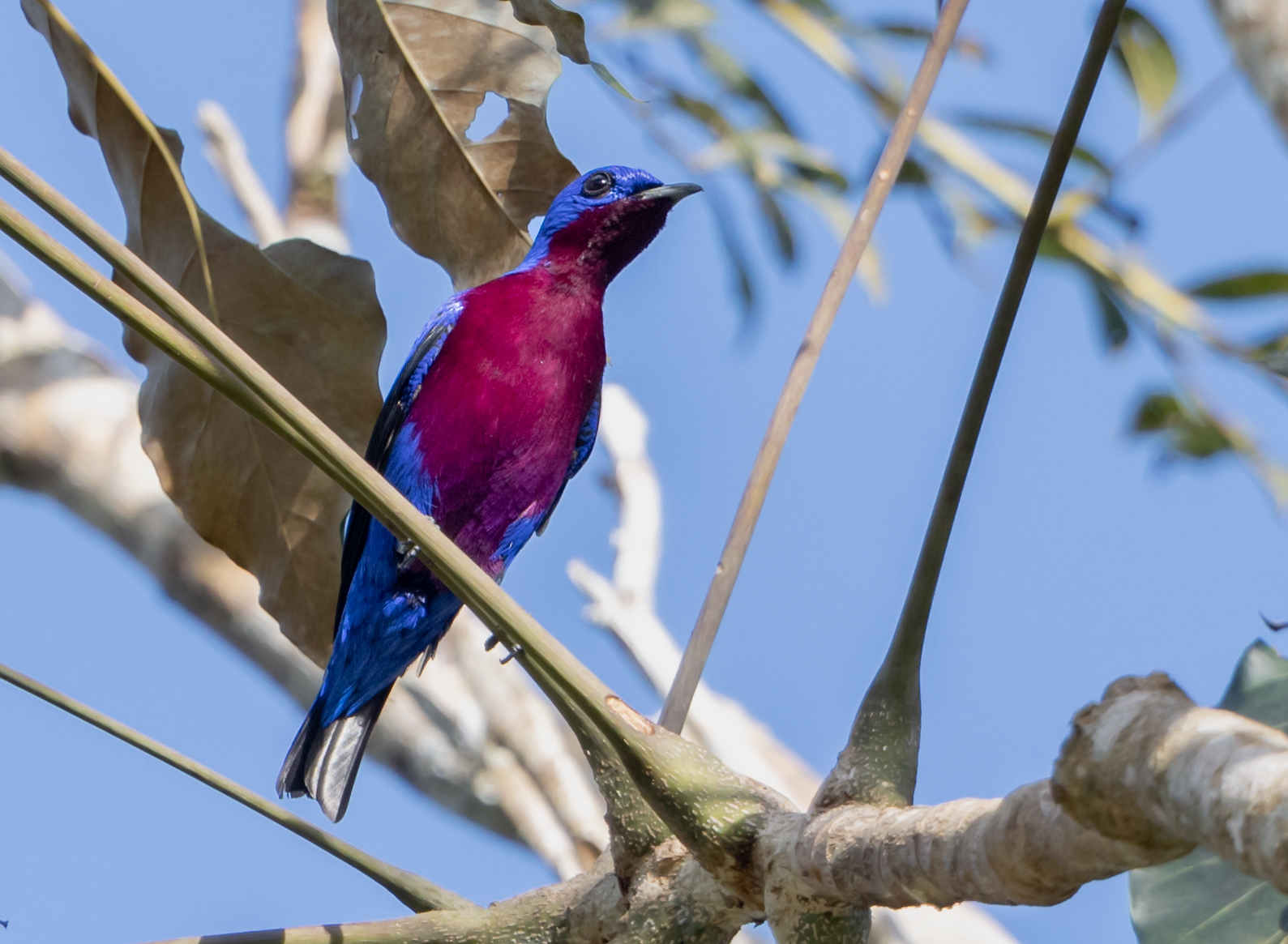
- Purple-breasted cotinga (male)

Conservation status
- Least Concern (IUCN 3.1)

Scientific classification
- Kingdom: Animalia
- Phylum: Chordata
- Class: Aves
- Order: Passeriformes
- Family: Cotingidae
- Genus: Cotinga
- Species: C. cotinga

Binomial name
- Cotinga cotinga (Linnaeus, 1766)

Synonyms
- Ampelis cotinga Linnaeus, 1766

= Purple-breasted cotinga =

Species of bird

The purple-breasted cotinga (Cotinga cotinga) is a species of bird in the family Cotingidae. It is found in Brazil, Colombia, French Guiana, Guyana, Peru, Suriname, and Venezuela.

== Taxonomy and systematics ==
The purple-breasted cotinga is monotypic. It and the banded cotinga (C. maculata) form a superspecies or are sister species.

== Description ==
The purple-breasted cotinga is 18 to 20.5 cm (7.1 to 8.1 in) long; three individuals weighed 50 to 55 g (1.8 to 1.9 oz). The sexes are dramatically dimorphic. Adult males have mostly deep cobalt blue upperparts with some black speckles on the crown and mantle. Their wings are black with very thin blue edges on the feathers; most edges are not visible. Their tail is black. Their throat, breast, and belly are deep purple and the rest of their underparts blue. Adult females are slightly larger than males. They have mostly dark brown upperparts with white feather tips and edges that produce a scaly appearance. Their wings are mostly dark brown with pale fawn tips and edges on most feathers. Their underparts are mostly dull buff-brown with a paler unmarked throat, darker scaling on the breast, and unmarked undertail coverts. Their tail is brown. Both sexes have a chestnut to dark brown iris and gray to dark gray legs and feet. Their short wide gray bill has a blackish tip. Immature birds are similar to adult females.

== Distribution and habitat ==
The purple-breasted cotinga has a disjunct distribution. By far its largest range extends from eastern Colombia across far southern Venezuela, and another arm extends from far eastern Venezuela across the Guianas. The two arms meet in northern Brazil, skirting much of western Amazonas state, and extending east to the north of a line roughly from central Amazonas to Bahia. It separately occupies a small range in eastern San Martín and southern Loreto departments of northern Peru. There are also scattered records in Brazil south of the large contiguous range. Some authors have speculated that the species is also in northeastern Bolivia but there are no records in that country.

The purple-breasted cotinga inhabits the canopy and edges of humid forest, where it apparently favors forest on sandy soils. It will also forage in tall trees in forest clearings. In elevation it is found below 300 m (1,000 ft) in Colombia, below 600 m (2,000 ft) in Venezuela, and below 800 m (2,600 ft) in Brazil.

== Behavior ==
=== Movement ===
The purple-breasted cotinga is believed to be a year-round resident, but at least one author has speculated that it might make some movements in response to changing availability of fruit.

=== Feeding ===
The purple-breasted cotinga feeds on fruits, with those of Psittacanthus mistletoes and Euterpe palms known to be part of its diet. It often forages singly though several individuals may share a fruiting tree and it has been observed joining mixed-species feeding flocks. It forages in the forest canopy, plucking fruit while perched or with short sallies.

=== Breeding ===
Nothing is known about the purple-breasted cotinga's breeding biology.

=== Vocal and non-vocal sounds ===
The purple-breasted cotinga is usually silent, but "a plaintive preeeeeeeer" has been noted. Males' wings make a "rattling or whistling with a clicking quality" in flight.

== Status ==
The IUCN has assessed the purple-breasted cotinga as being of Least Concern. It has a large range; its population size is not known and is believed to be decreasing. No immediate threats have been identified. It is "seemingly uncommon" in Colombia, "rare and very local" in Peru, "rare to uncommon" in Venezuela, and uncommon in Brazil. It occurs in at least one protected area in each country it inhabits.
