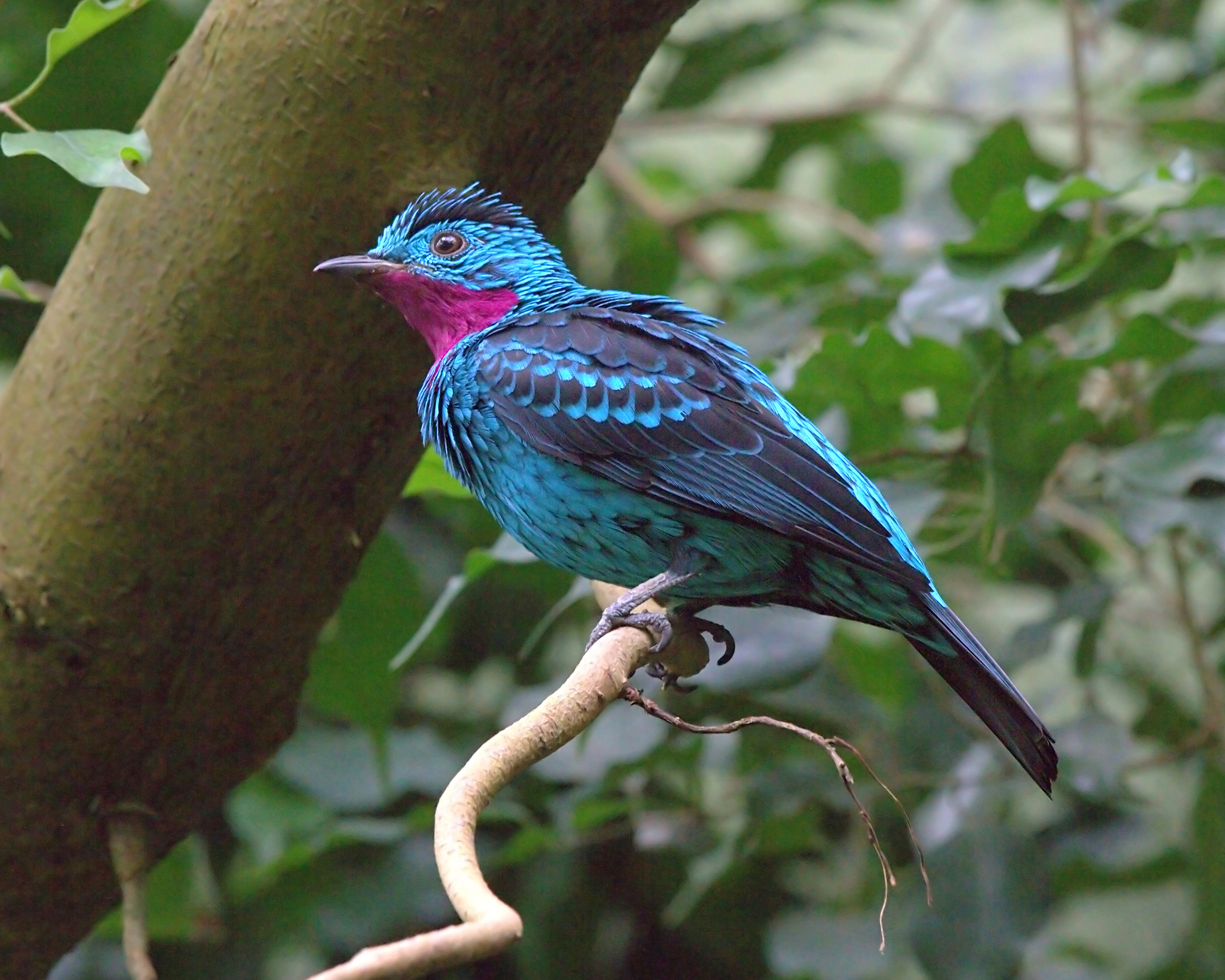
- Male at Cincinnati Zoo
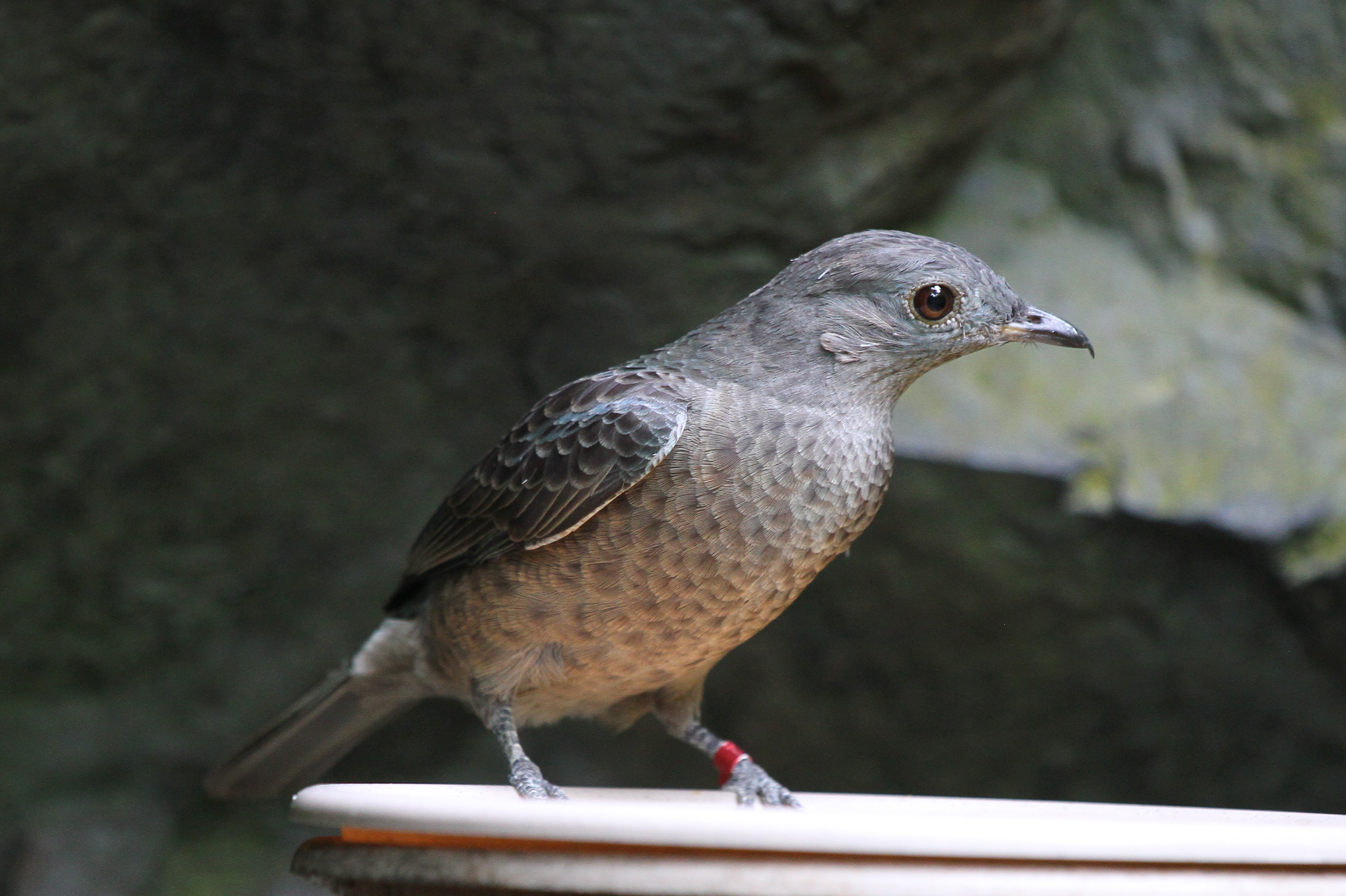
- Female at Cincinnati Zoo

Conservation status
- Least Concern (IUCN 3.1)

Scientific classification
- Kingdom: Animalia
- Phylum: Chordata
- Class: Aves
- Order: Passeriformes
- Family: Cotingidae
- Genus: Cotinga
- Species: C. cayana

Binomial name
- Cotinga cayana (Linnaeus, 1766)

Synonyms
- Ampelis cayana Linnaeus, 1766

= Spangled cotinga =

Species of bird

The spangled cotinga (Cotinga cayana) is a species of bird in the family Cotingidae, the cotingas. It is found in the canopy of the Amazon rainforest in South America.

Because of their bright, striking colours, cotingas have been hunted by native and colonial peoples for their feathers and meat. The feathers of some species are used in making fishing flies and lures.

== Taxonomy ==
In 1760 the French zoologist Mathurin Jacques Brisson included a description of the spangled cotinga in his Ornithologie based on a specimen collected in Cayenne in French Guiana. He used the French name Le cotinga de Cayenne and the Latin Cotinga Cayanensis. Although Brisson coined Latin names, these do not conform to the binomial system and are not recognised by the International Commission on Zoological Nomenclature. When in 1766 the Swedish naturalist Carl Linnaeus updated his Systema Naturae for the twelfth edition, he added 240 species that had been previously described by Brisson. One of these was the spangled cotinga. Linnaeus included a brief description, coined the binomial name Ampelis cayana and cited Brisson's work. This species is now placed in the genus Cotinga that was introduced by Brisson in 1760. The spangled cotinga is monotypic.

== Description ==
The species is sexually dimorphic with the male being a bright turquoise-blue with a large deep wine-red throat and black to the wings, tail and back. The female is overall dull brownish-gray with darker wings and faint mottling below.

== Distribution and habitat ==
The spangled cotinga is found throughout the Amazon Basin. It is not considered to be threatened because of its wide distribution.

== Behaviour ==
As other members of the genus Cotinga, this species is frugivorous, but it has also been recorded feeding on insects. They are found in the upper canopy of the rainforest. Males often perch in dead trees high above the forest floor. The spangled cotinga and other members of the genus Cotinga do not sing or vocalise although they have been heard making a "whistling" sound from the wings during flight.

== Gallery ==
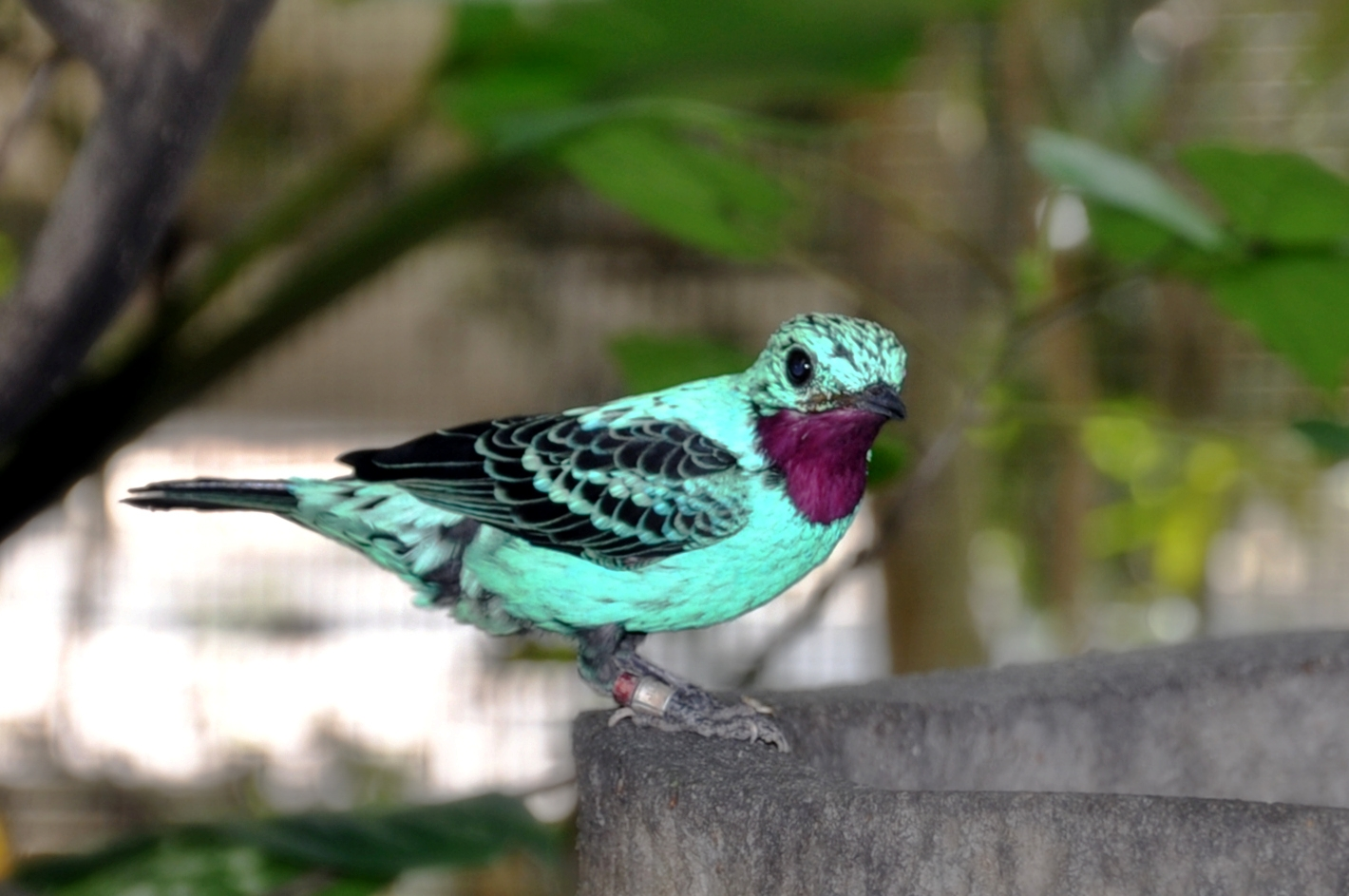
At Jurong Bird Park, Singapore

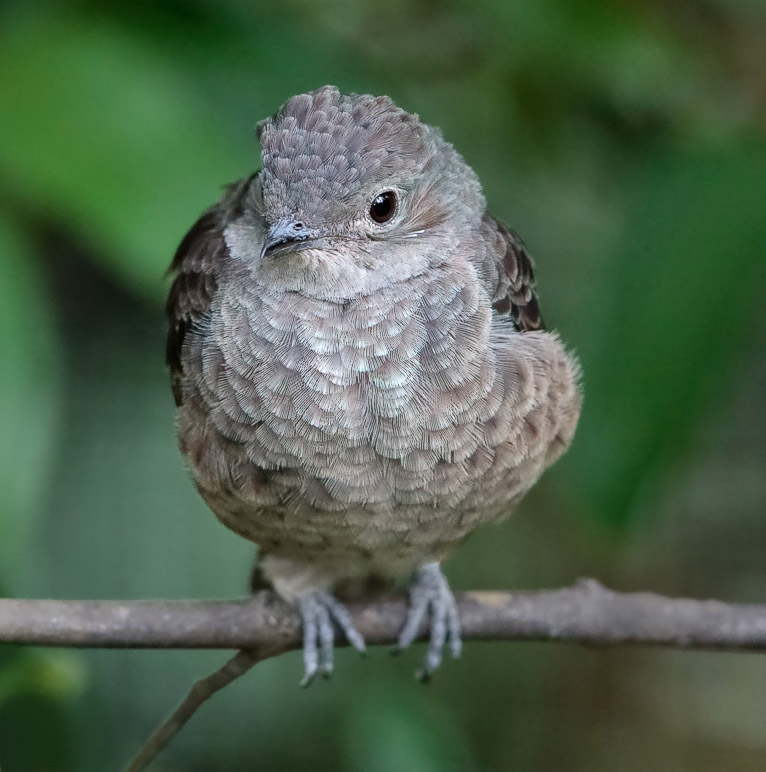
Female at Jurong Bird Park, Singapore
