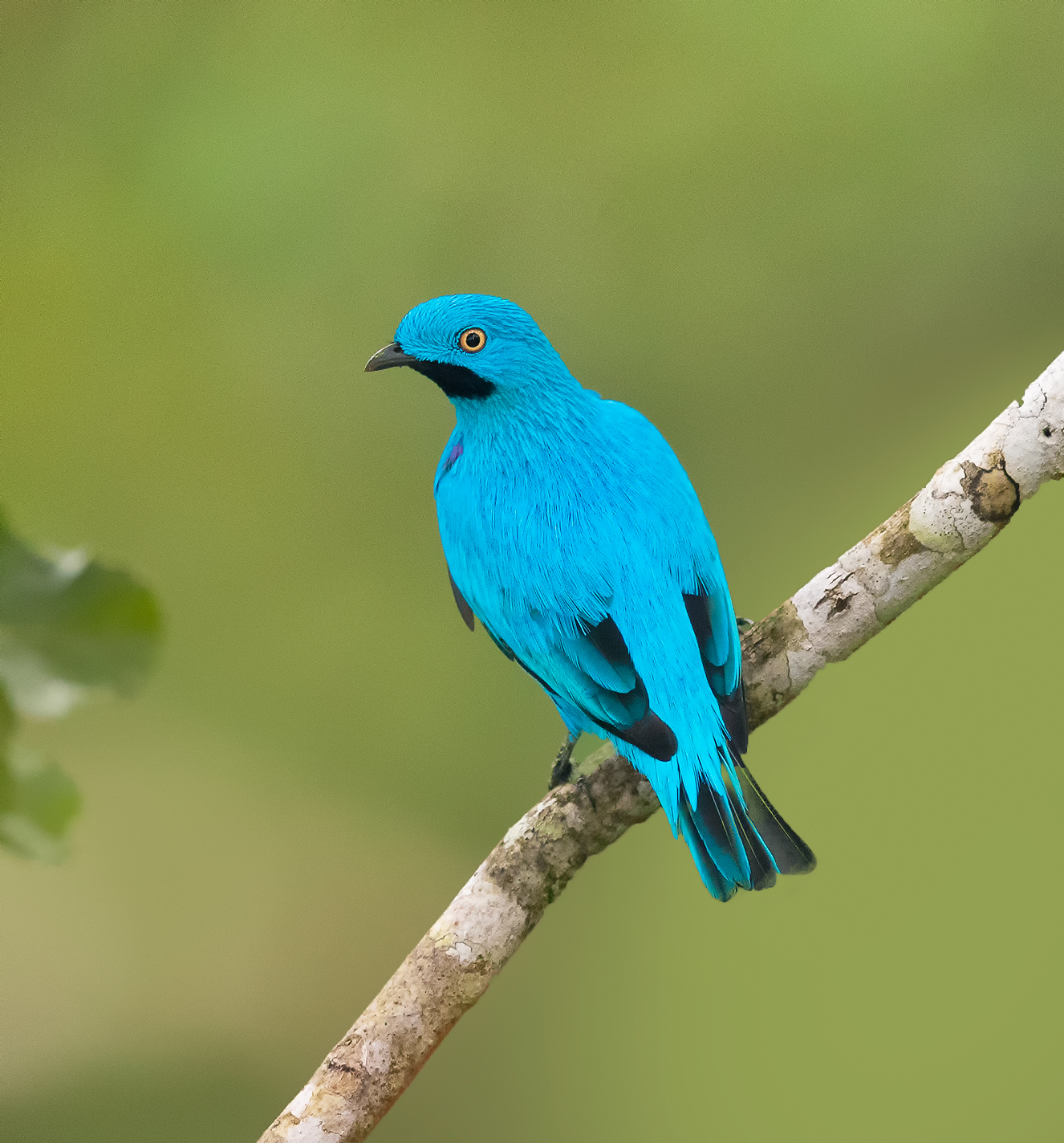

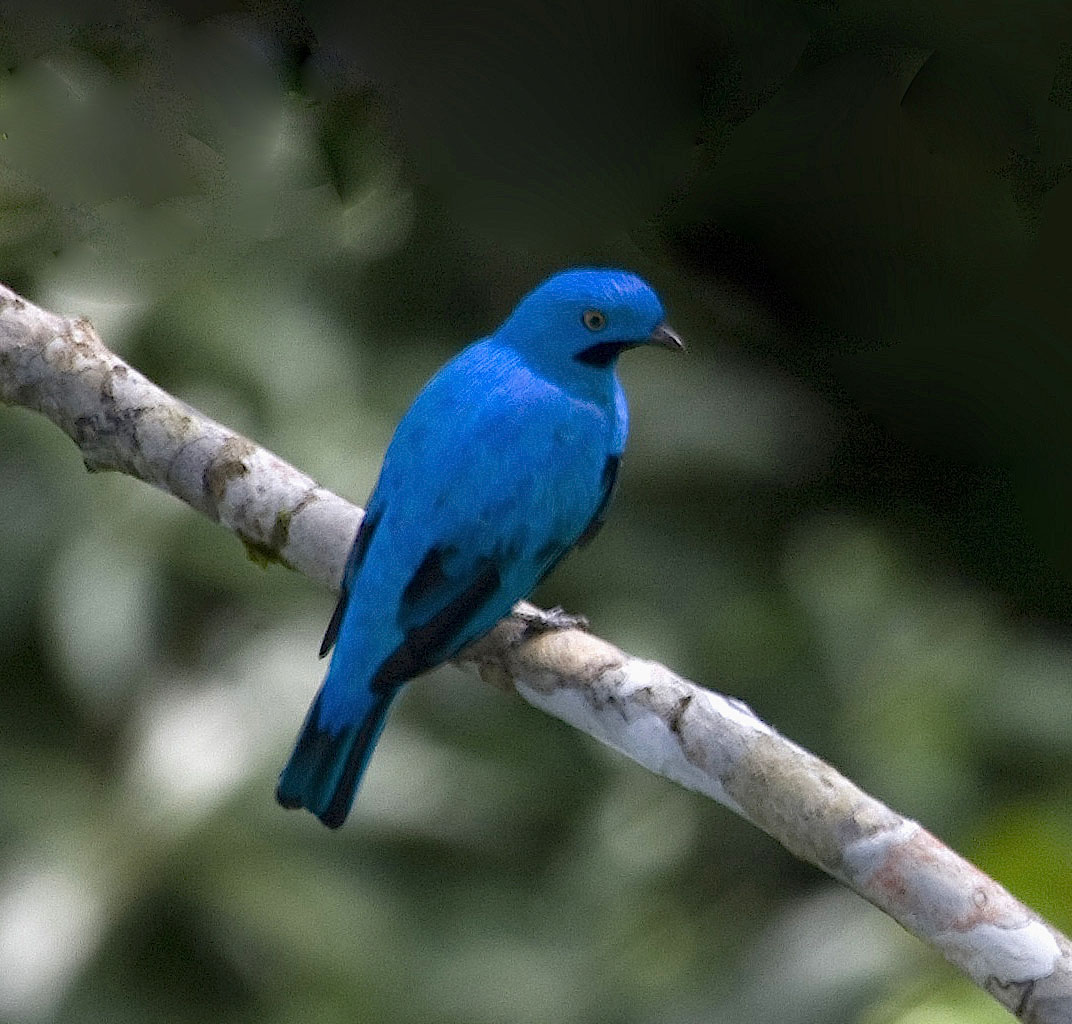

Conservation status
- Least Concern (IUCN 3.1)

Scientific classification
- Kingdom: Animalia
- Phylum: Chordata
- Class: Aves
- Order: Passeriformes
- Family: Cotingidae
- Genus: Cotinga
- Species: C. maynana

Binomial name
- Cotinga maynana (Linnaeus, 1766)

Synonyms
- Ampelis maynana Linnaeus, 1766

= Plum-throated cotinga =

Species of bird

The plum-throated cotinga (Cotinga maynana) is a species of bird in the family Cotingidae. It is found in Bolivia, Brazil, Colombia, Ecuador, and Peru.

== Taxonomy and systematics ==
In 1760 the French zoologist Mathurin Jacques Brisson included a description of the plum-throated cotinga in his Ornithologie based on a specimen collected in Maynas Province, Peru. He used the French name Le cotinga des Mayas and the Latin Cotinga Maynanensis. Although Brisson coined Latin names, these do not conform to the binomial system and are not recognized by the International Commission on Zoological Nomenclature. When in 1766 the Swedish naturalist Carl Linnaeus updated his Systema Naturae for the twelfth edition, he added 240 species that had been previously described by Brisson, one of which was the plum-throated cotinga. Linnaeus included a brief description, coined the binomial name Ampelis maynana and cited Brisson's work. This species is now placed in the genus Cotinga that was introduced by Brisson in 1760.

The plum-throated cotinga is monotypic.

== Description ==
The plum-throated cotinga is 19 to 20.5 cm (7.5 to 8.1 in) long and weighs about 70 g (2.5 oz). The sexes are dramatically dimorphic. Adult males are mostly shiny turquoise-blue. Their throat has the eponymous plum-purple patch. Their remiges are black with a large white patch on the underside and wide blue edges toward the end; the wings appear mostly blue when folded. Their rectrices are blackish with wide blue edges and like the wings, the tail appears blue when folded. Their underparts have scattered purple patches and blackish undertail coverts. Adult females have dark grayish brown upperparts with fawn edges on the feathers. Their throat is fawn and their breast fawn with darker scaly markings. Their belly and undertail coverts are cinnamon-brown with darker mottling. Both sexes have a pale to darker yellow iris, a gray to blackish bill with a slightly hooked tip, and gray to blackish legs and feet. Immature birds of both sexes resemble adult females.

== Distribution and habitat ==
The plum-throated cotinga is a bird of the upper Amazon Basin. Its range includes approximately the southeastern third of Colombia, the eastern third of Ecuador, eastern Peru, far northern Bolivia, and Brazil east roughly to a line from Mato Grosso do Sul north to Tocantins. It inhabits humid lowland rainforest, especially várzea and to a lesser extent terra firme. It seems to favor the latter in Colombia. In elevation it reaches 700 m (2,300 ft) in Colombia and Ecuador and locally up to 1,000 m (3,300 ft) in Peru.

== Behavior ==
=== Movement ===
The plum-throated cotinga is believed to be a year-round resident, but at least one author has speculated that it might make some short seasonal movements.

=== Feeding ===
The plum-throated cotinga feeds on a wide variety of fruits, with apparent favor to those of Psittacanthus mistletoes, Euterpe palms, and Ficus figs. It forages in pairs and small groups and also in company with spangled cotingas (C. cayana) where their ranges overlap. It primarily forages in the canopy though it will descend to the understory. It takes fruit while perched and with short flutter-flights from a perch.

=== Breeding ===
Males make a courtship display flight by dropping from a high perch, flying in the open, and returning to the perch. Nothing else is known about the plum-throated cotinga's breeding biology.

=== Vocal and non-vocal sounds ===
The plum-throated cotinga is not highly vocal. What is thought to be its call is "a quiet, deep, hollow, descending hoot: pooh". Its wings make a "sputtering sound" during display flight. This mechanical sound has also been described as "rattling, twittering, or whistling in quality".

== Status ==
The IUCN has assessed the plum-throated cotinga as being of Least Concern. It has a large range; its population size is not known and is believed to be decreasing. No immediate threats have been identified. It is considered fairly common in Colombia and Ecuador, somewhat more common in Brazil, and uncommon in Peru. It occurs in several protected areas.
