= Hueymiccaihuitl =

Tenth month of the Aztec calendar

Hueymiccaihuitl, also called Xocotlhuetzi, is the name of the tenth month of the Aztec calendar. Hueymiccaihuitl is a month that lasted 20 days as depicted in drawings showing the month as 4 sets of 5 days. It is also a festival in the Aztec religion. The Principal deity is Xocotl. It is called Great Feast of the Dead.
