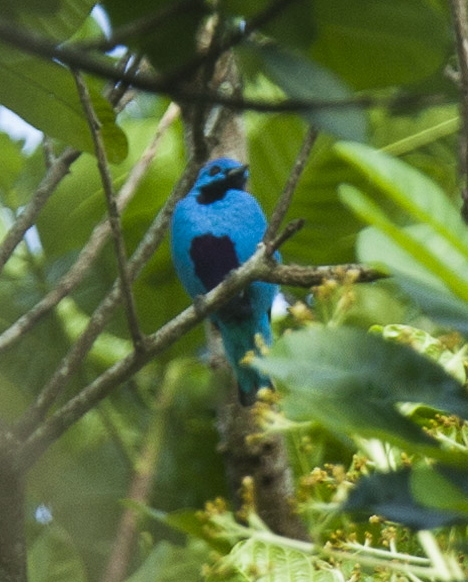
- Male

Conservation status
- Least Concern (IUCN 3.1)

Scientific classification
- Kingdom: Animalia
- Phylum: Chordata
- Class: Aves
- Order: Passeriformes
- Family: Cotingidae
- Genus: Cotinga
- Species: C. nattererii

Binomial name
- Cotinga nattererii (Boissonneau, 1840)

Synonyms
- Ampelis Nattererii (protonym)

= Blue cotinga =

Species of bird

The blue cotinga (Cotinga nattererii) is a species of bird in the family Cotingidae. It is found in Colombia, north-west Ecuador, eastern to western Panama and western Venezuela in tropical moist lowland forests and heavily degraded former forest. In relation to range and population size this species is not considered to be vulnerable.

== Description ==
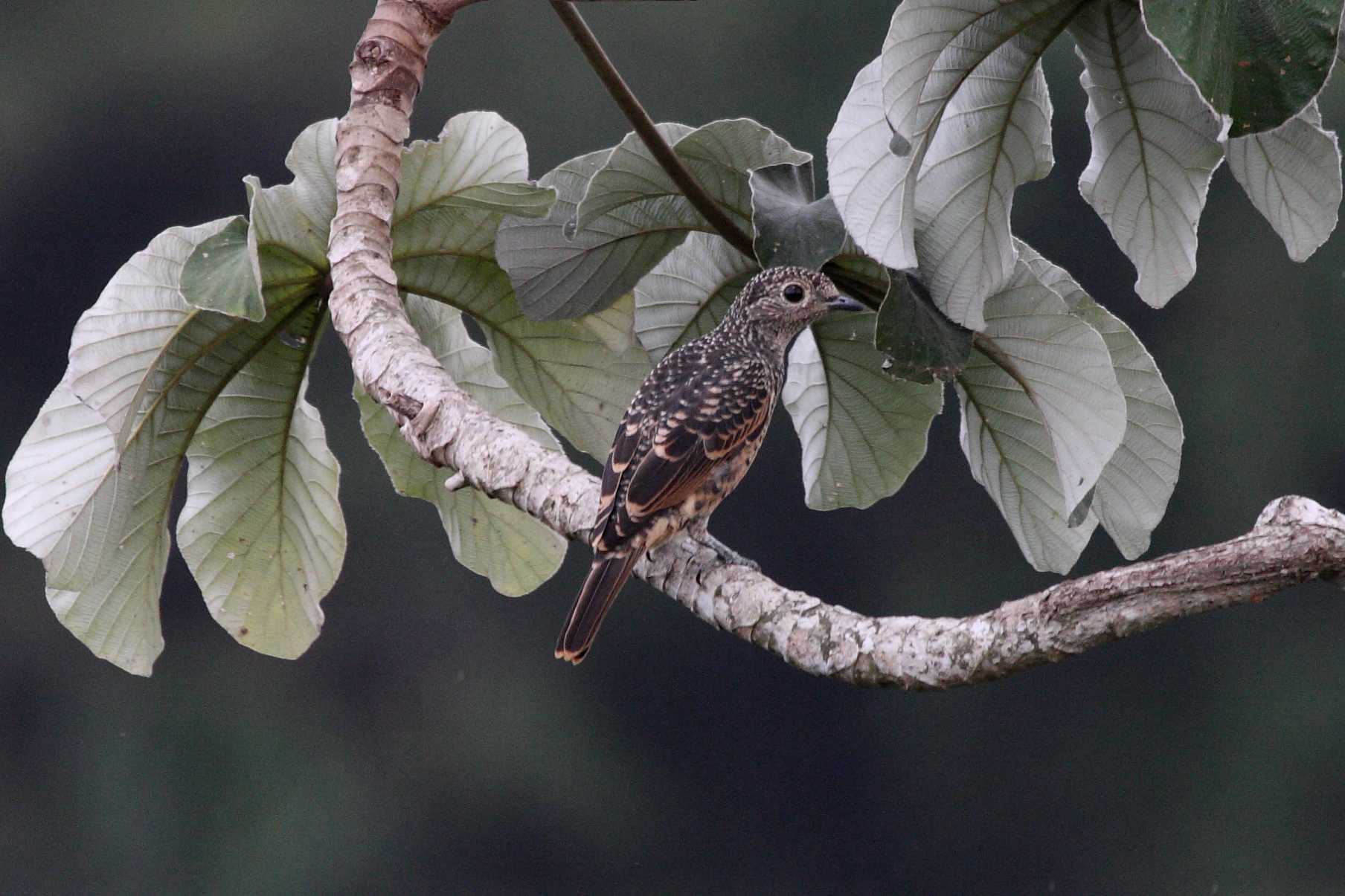
Female

The blue cotinga is a plump, dove-like bird with a small head. It grows to a length of about 7 inches (18 cm). The male has glossy blue plumage and a black bib with a purple iridescent sheen on the throat and breast. There is a black ring round the eye, and the wings and tail are black with broad blue margins. On the belly there is a circular patch of purple. The female looks quite different; she is dark brown above, each feather having a pale margin which gives the bird a scaly appearance, and the underparts are pale brown with each feather having a buff margin. The turquoise cotinga (Cotinga ridgwayi) is a similar species with which this bird might be confused, but it has a different range.

== Distribution and range ==
This species is native to Central America and South America. Its range extends from central Panama southwards to northwestern Ecuador and Venezuela. It occurs on the borders of moist woodland, in the canopy of primary forest and in tall secondary forest. Its altitudinal range is up to about 900 metres (3,000 ft).

== Ecology ==
The blue cotinga lives high in the canopy. It is mostly a solitary bird, but may sometimes be seen in groups on a fruiting tree; the diet consists of fruit, plucked while hovering briefly. The male often sits in a stationary position on a high perch on an emergent tree, under which conditions his brilliant blue colour may be indiscernible while he is silhouetted against the sky. This bird does not seem to have a song or call, but the male may, while in flight, make a whirring or rattling sound with his wings, perhaps a form of display.

== Status ==
Cotinga nattererii has a very wide range and is described as fairly common. For these reasons, the International Union for Conservation of Nature has rated its conservation status as being of "least concern".
