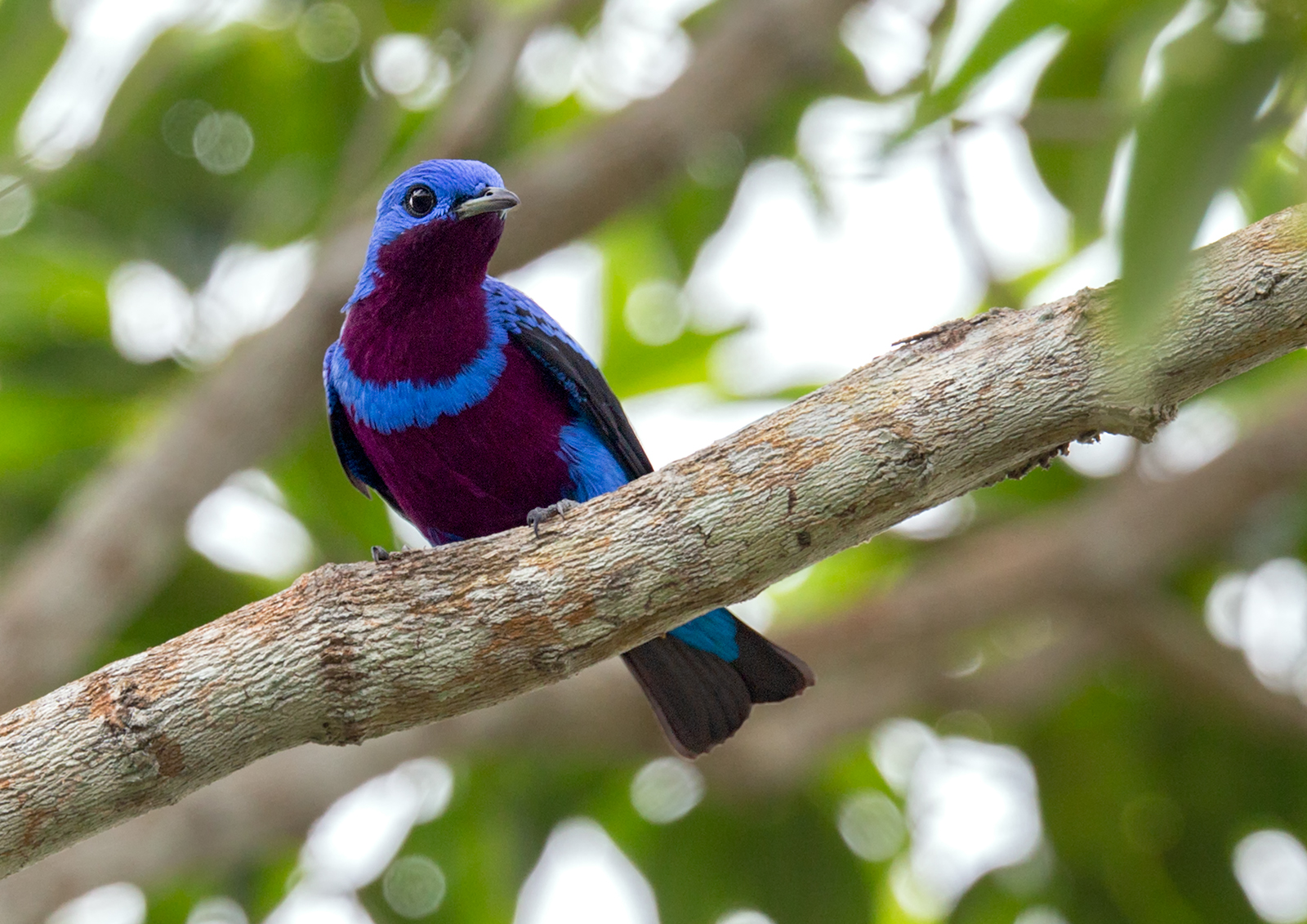

Conservation status
- Critically Endangered (IUCN 3.1)
- CITES Appendix I

Scientific classification
- Kingdom: Animalia
- Phylum: Chordata
- Class: Aves
- Order: Passeriformes
- Family: Cotingidae
- Genus: Cotinga
- Species: C. maculata

Binomial name
- Cotinga maculata (Müller, 1776)

= Banded cotinga =

Species of bird

The banded cotinga (Cotinga maculata) is a species of bird in the family Cotingidae. It is endemic to southeastern Brazil.

Its natural habitat is tropical moist lowland forests. It is threatened by habitat loss as its population is estimated to number between 250 and 999 mature individuals.

== Description ==
Birds are around 20 cm long, and males are a bright blue with a black spotted back. The throat and belly are bright purple with a blue band across the chest. Females are a dull brown with some white mottling. The primaries are modified to produce a slight whir during display.

== Distribution ==
The majority of the species is concentrated in the state of Bahia, with occasional records from the nearby state of Minas Gerais. It most likely once occurred in Rio de Janeiro and Espírito Santo, but has since been extirpated.

== Ecology and behavior ==
It inhabits the canopy of the lowland Atlantic forest, and has a diet of seeds, berries, especially from Byrsonima sericea and ficuses, fruit, caterpillars, and other insects. It shares its habitat with other endemic birds, such as the saffron toucanet and pin-tailed manakin. The banded cotinga is not migratory and its nest is a simple cup.

== Conservation ==
The greatest threat to the banded cotinga's survival is deforestation. Continued habitat fragmentation has also complicated matters, sending populations into a sharp decline. Some protected areas, such as the RPPN Estação Veracel and Reserva Serra Bonita, are now thought to serve as bastions for this species.
