= Mixtec culture =

Pre-Hispanic archaeological culture

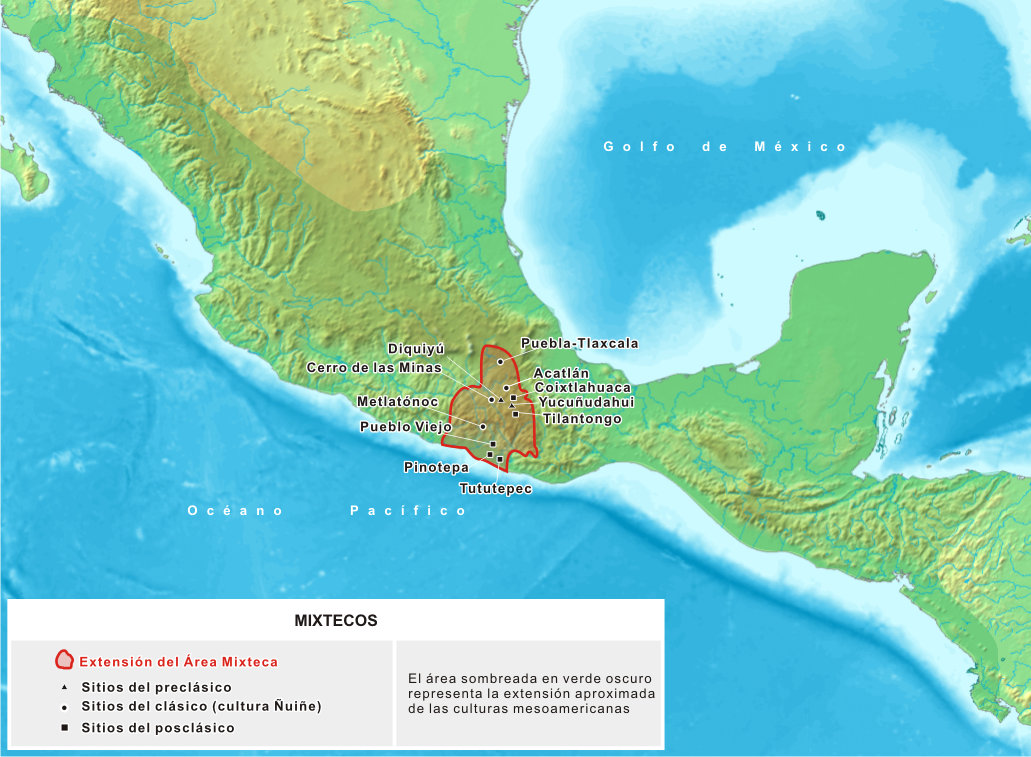
- Religion: Mixtec religion
- Geographical range: Present day Mexico: Oaxaca; Puebla; Guerrero
- Period: 1500 BC
- Dates: 1500 BC – 1523 AD

The Mixtec culture (also called the Mixtec civilization) was a pre-Columbian archaeological culture, corresponding to the ancestors of the Mixtec people; they called themselves Ñuu savi (a name that their descendants still preserve), which means "people or nation of the rain". It had its first manifestations in the Mesoamerican Middle Preclassic period (12th century BC – 10th century BC) and ended with the Spanish conquest in the first decades of the 16th century. The historical territory of this people is the area known as La Mixteca (Ñuu Dzahui, in ancient Mixtec), a mountainous region located between the current Mexican states of Puebla, Oaxaca, and Guerrero.

The chronology of the Mixtec culture is one of the longest in Mesoamerica, due to its continuity and antiquity. It began as a result of the cultural diversification of the Otomanguean language speaking people in the area of Oaxaca. The Mixtecs shared numerous cultural traits with their Zapotec neighbors. In fact, both populations call themselves "people of the rain or of the cloud". The divergent evolution of the Mixtecs and Zapotecs, favored by the ecological environment, encouraged urban concentration in the cities of San José Mogote and Monte Albán, while in the valleys of the Sierra Mixteca the urbanization followed a pattern of smaller human concentrations in numerous towns. Relations between Mixtecs and Zapotecs were constant during the Preclassic, when the Mixtecs were also definitively incorporated into the network of Pan-Mesoamerican relations. Some Mixtec products are among the luxury objects found in the Olmec heartland.

During the Preclassic Mesoamerican period, the prime of Teotihuacán and Monte Albán stimulated the flourishing of the ñuiñe region (Lowland Mixteca). In cities such as Cerro de las Minas, stelae have been found that show a style of writing that combines elements of Monte Albán and Teotihuacán writing. The Zapotec influence can be seen in the numerous urns found in the sites of the Lowland Mixteca, which almost always represent the Old God of Fire. In the same context, the Highland Mixteca witnessed the collapse of Yucunundahua (Huamelulpan) and the balkanization of the area. The concentration of power in Ñuiñe was the cause of conflicts between the cities of the region and the states of the Highland Mixteca, which explains the fortification of the Ñuiñe cities. The decline of the Ñuiñe culture coincided with that of Teotihuacan and Monte Albán. At the end of the Mesoamerican Classic (c. 7th and 8th) many elements of the classic culture of the Lowland Mixteca became obsolete and were forgotten.

The conditions that allowed the flourishing of the Mixtec culture took place from the 13th century onwards. Eight Deer Jaguar Claw's political temperament led him to consolidate the Mixtec presence in La Costa. There he founded the kingdom of Tututepec (Yucudzáa) and later undertook a military campaign to unify numerous states under his power, including important sites as Tilantongo (Ñuu Tnoo Huahi Andehui). This would not have been possible without the alliance with Four Jaguar, a lord of Nahua-Toltec affiliation who ruled Ñuu Cohyo (Tollan-Chollollan). The reign of Eight Deer ended with his assassination at the hands of the son of a noblewoman who in turn had been assassinated earlier by Eight Deer himself.

Throughout the Postclassic period, the network of dynastic alliances between the Mixtec and Zapotec states intensified, although paradoxically the rivalry between the two populations increased. However, they acted together to defend themselves from Mexica incursions. Mexico-Tenochtitlan and its allies would win over powerful states such as Coixtlahuaca (Yodzo Coo), which was incorporated as a tributary province of the Aztec Empire. However, Yucudzáa (Tututepec) maintained its independence and helped the Zapotecs resist in the Isthmus of Tehuantepec. When the Spaniards arrived in La Mixteca, many lords voluntarily submitted as vassals of Spain and retained some privileges. Other lordships tried to resist but were militarily defeated.

== La Mixteca ==
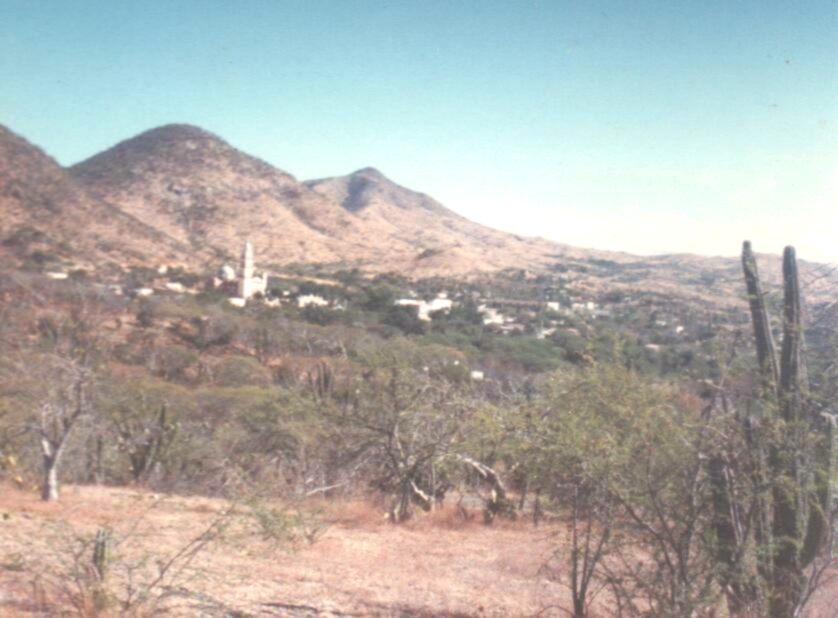
Landscape of the Acatlán valley, near San Jerónimo Xayacatlán (Lowland Mixteca Poblana).

The historical territory of the Mixtecs is located in southern Mexico. With an area of more than 40,000 km^{2}, La Mixteca, as it is known today, occupies the south of Puebla, the east of Guerrero, and the west of Oaxaca. La Mixteca was called Mixtecapan by the Mexica, which in Nahuatl means Country of the Mixtecs. In the ancient Mixtec language, the country was called Ñuu Dzahui, which Janssen and Pérez Jiménez translate as Country of the caneliata.

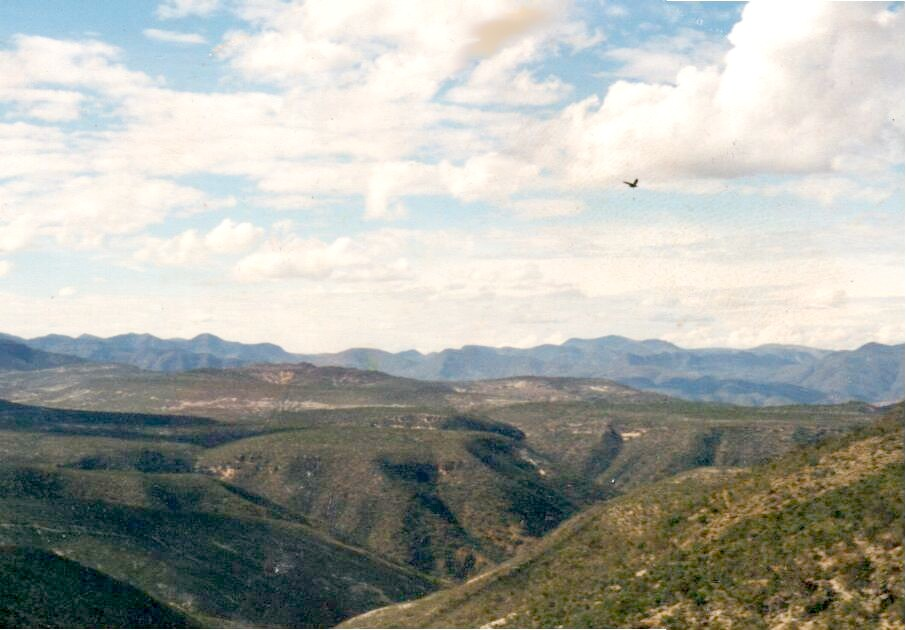
Landscape of La Mixteca, near Nativitas Monte Verde (Oaxaca)

The Mixtecs never formed a political unit that integrated all the villages occupied by members of that people, although the largest political unit known to that pre-Columbian nation was formed under the government of Eight Deer Jaguar Claw in Tilantongo. From a geographical point of view, the Mixtec territory is very diverse, although it is unified by the presence of large mountain ranges such as the Sierra Mixteca or the Neovolcanic Axis. However, as Dahlgren observes, its boundaries are not precise, since their definition varies according to the approach adopted. From the cultural point of view, La Mixteca is the territory inhabited by all the populations that have been called Mixtec in different sources, although this delimitation is still ambiguous since the Mixtec people could coexist with communities of other ethnic origins that were otherwise linguistically and culturally related. The tentative delimitation proposed by González Leyva indicates that...

The western border of La Mixteca begins on the coast of the Pacific Ocean, in Coahuitlán. From there, in a straight line, it goes to the towns of Ometepec and Igualapa (Guerrero), continues, and reaches the Atoyac river of Puebla. It continues along it as far as Tuzantlán (Puebla) - northwest of Acatlán, Puebla. From here, in an easterly direction, the borders touch the hills Largo, Palos Blancos, Pila and Gordo. In this one the Gavilán river is born, whose channel passes by the locality of Zapotitlán (Puebla), advances along the slopes of the Miahuatepec hill, meets the Zapotitlán river and, near Coxcatlán (Puebla), joins the Salado river (Puebla). Its banks reach Quiotepec (Oaxaca), extends to Cuicatlán, discharges into the Grande river and goes through the Tomellín canyon. The river adopts this name, restarts its journey in a southerly direction, then changes its name to San Antonio, and ends at the Camote hill. From here, the border, again in a straight line, runs to San Francisco Telixtlahuaca and Huitzio (Oaxaca); it moves through the rugged ravines of La Culebra and Las Lomas de Alas, and skims the towns of Huitepec, Totomachapa and Teojomulco. It heads towards the Chinche and La Rana hills, passes them, goes through Mixtepec; turns west towards Manialtepec, collides with that town, resumes its march and ends in the Pacific.

According to its characteristics it is usually divided into several regions whose boundaries are equally imprecise. In spite of this, the internal subdivision of the region is a popular topic among specialists. Since colonial times, a distinction was made between the different zones that made up La Mixteca. The simplest was divided into Highland Mixteca, corresponding to the Sierra Mixteca, and Lowland Mixteca, which included the lands located in the piedmont of the Sierra Madre del Sur. Antonio de los Reyes indicates in his Arte en lengua mixteca that La Mixteca is divided into six regions: the one inhabited by the Chochos, the eastern one bordering Los Valles, the Highland Mixteca or Ñudzavuiñuhu, the Lowland Mixteca or Ñuiñe, the region of the Putla mountains or Ñuñuma, and Nuñdaa, Ñundevi or Ñuñama in the Pacific coastal plain.

The Highland Mixteca is the area occupied by the intermontane valleys of Tlaxiaco, Nochixtlán, Putla and Coixtlahuaca, nestled in the foothills of the Sierra Mixteca, an extremely mountainous area that is the point where the Sierra Madre del Sur and the Neovolcanic Axis meet. The climate in this region ranges from temperate to cold, and is relatively more humid than in the rest of the Mixtecs. Several rivers originate in the Highland Mixteca and are tributaries of important watersheds such as the Balsas and Atoyac rivers.

To the north of the Highland Mixteca is the Lowland Mixteca, which includes several municipalities in northwestern Oaxaca and southern Puebla. The Lowland Mixteca is located at a lower altitude than the Lowland Mixteca, since the altitude of the terrain hardly exceeds 2000 masl. Because of this characteristic, the Lowland Mixteca is hotter and drier than the rest of the Mixtec territory, which is why it was called ñuiñe (in Mixtec language: Ñuuniñei 'Hot Land'). Most of the Lowland Mixteca is part of the Balsas River basin, which receives the waters of the Atoyac, Acatlán, Mixteco, and other rivers. The climate is typically that of a dry broadleaf forest, an ecosystem characterized by a combination of xerophytic vegetation with other species that grow periodically during the rainy season.

=== Geographic location ===
The region where the Mixtec civilization settled is known as the Mixtec region. There are three zones that form the Mixtec region:

- Lowland Mixteca: northwestern part of the state of Oaxaca and southeastern part of the state of Puebla.
- Highland Mixteca: northwest of the state of Guerrero and west of Oaxaca.
- Coastal Mixteca: corresponds to the Costa Chica, which is divided between the states of Oaxaca and Guerrero.

== Mythology ==
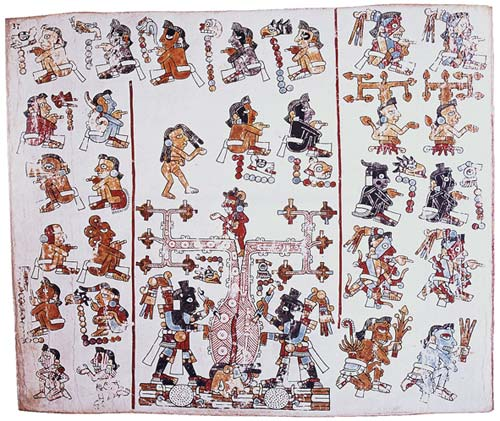
Page 37 of the Codex Vindobonensis Mexicanus I. The central scene represents, supposedly, the origin of the Mixtecs from a tree that gave birth to the ancestors of this people.

Mixtec mythology shares many elements with the rest of Mesoamerican traditions. As in the case of the Mexica or the Maya, the Mixtecs also believed that they lived in the "era" of a Fifth Sun and that, before their time, the world had gone through a series of creations and destructions. In the beginning, the earth was a chaos, in which everything was confused. The spirits of the creative forces were flying in the air. They are known by their calendrical names, recorded in the codex produced by this people. These spirits were One Deer-Jaguar Serpent and One Deer-Puma Serpent. They are the Mixtec correspondents of Ometecuhtli and Omecíhuatl, the "Two Gods", who represent the dual principle of the whole universe. In the Mixtec myth, these two divinities separate light from darkness, earth from water, above from below, and create the four creator gods who would give birth to the others and to humanity, which was created from corn.

Legend has it that one of the four sons of the primordial couple made a hole in a tree that was in the clouds and copulated with it. This character is identified with the calendrical name Nine Wind, one of the names of the Feathered Serpent. In this way, the tree gave birth soon after. From it was born a man who would challenge the sun, lord of La Mixteca, in a duel to death. The myth of the Arrowman of the Sun relates that this character shot his arrows against the star, while the sun fought him with its rays. They did this until sunset, when the sun fell mortally wounded (and this would be the explanation for the flesh-colored color of the sunsets) and hid behind the mountains. As the Arrower of the Sun feared that the star would be reborn and reclaim his ancient lands, he brought the people and made them settle on the land he had won, and hastened them to cultivate the corn milpas that very night. So, when the Sun was reborn the next day, nothing could be done thus the Mixtecs became owners of the region by divine and military right.

According to their mythology, the Mixtecs were descendants of the sons of the Apoala tree. One of these sons defeated the Sun and won the land for the Mixtec people. The main deity of the Mixtecs in pre-Hispanic times was Dzahui, god of rain and patron of the Mixtec nation. Another divinity of great importance was Nine Wind-Coo Dzahui, civilizing hero who gave them the knowledge of agriculture and civilization.

== History ==
The Mixtecs are one of the oldest populations of Mesoamerica. Their language belongs to the Mixtec language group, related to Zapotec and Otomi. There is evidence of human occupation in La Mixteca since the fifth millennium B.C.; however, it was only after the development of agriculture in Mesoamerica that the process that gave rise to the pre-Hispanic Mixtec culture began. Around the third millennium B.C., the first agricultural settlements appeared in the region, whose economy was based on the four basic Mesoamerican crops: chili, corn, beans, and squash. Two thousand years later, amid the Middle Preclassic period, La Mixteca was the scene of an urban revolution, where population centers grew and were integrated into the vast network of exchanges that united Mesoamerican populations. Like most Mesoamerican societies, the Mixtecs did not form a political unit in pre-Hispanic times, but were organized into small states composed of several populations linked by hierarchical relationships.

The history of the Mixtec in the Preclassic and Classic periods is little known, especially in relation to other contemporary Mesoamerican populations or to the period of flourishing of La Mixteca, corresponding to the Postclassic. At that time emerged the expansionism of Tututepec, a city founded by Eight Deer Jaguar Claw that came to dominate a large territory between Coastal Mixteca and Highland Mixteca, while establishing a series of alliances with some states of central Mesoamerica. Except for isolated cases, such as Tututepec, most of La Mixteca was occupied peacefully by the Spaniards from the second decade of the 16th century.

Main preclassic Mixtec populations (blue dots) and location of other contemporaneous sites (black dots).

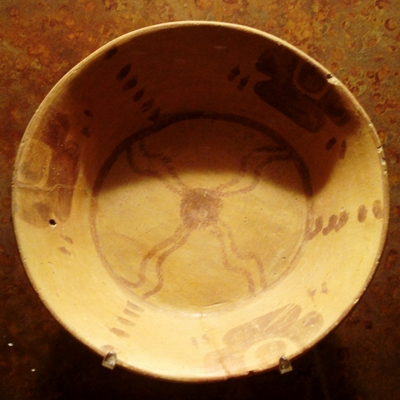
Red-on-Bayo pottery from the Highland Mixteca. Middle Preclassic Period. MNA Collection.

=== Preclassic Period ===
In La Mixteca, the first sedentary populations began to appear from the 16th century BC onwards. This stage in the history of the Mixtec people corresponds to the Cruz phase in Highland Mixteca, the Pre-Ñudée and Ñudée phases in Lowland Mixteca and the Charco phase on the Coast. The development of these early agricultural villages in the region was contemporary to what was occurring in other areas of Mesoamerica, such as central Mexico, the Central Valleys of Oaxaca and the Gulf Coast of Mexico. However, the Mixtec communities of the Formative period never reached the dimensions of the protourban populations of the Central Valleys, such as San José Mogote and Monte Albán. The settlement pattern of the Mixtecs in those years consisted of small communities dedicated to incipient agriculture, although there is evidence of their incorporation into the international exchange network of Mesoamerica.

An example of this link to other Mesoamerican societies is the influence of the Olmec style in the ceramics of Highland Mixteca. In sites such as Huamelulpan and Tayata, figurines have been found that have Olmec iconographic characteristics, a style widely spread in almost all of Mesoamerica during the first millennium BC. On the other hand, in the Olmec nuclear area, Red-on-Bayo ceramic objects have been found that were undoubtedly produced in the region of Tayata, according to the studies that have been carried out on the chemical composition of those archaeological materials. During the period of formation of Mixtec cultural traits, social stratification was incipient, as shown by the few differences that have been found in the remains of dwellings corresponding to those times. On the other hand, the function of the buildings was not clearly differentiated either.

Towards the end of the Middle Preclassic — a period in which Mesoamerica saw the flourishing of the Olmec style, which was widely spread in the area — some towns began to appear in Highland Mixteca that were home to thousands of people in their heyday. Among them were Monte Negro and Huamelulpan, the former located near Tilantongo, which several hundred years later would become the head of one of the most powerful Mixtec states; and the latter, in the area of Tlaxiaco. On the other hand, in Lowland Mixteca, the population of Cerro de las Minas began to flourish in the valley of the Mixteco River. In this period, which spans approximately from the 5th century BC to the 2nd century AD, Mixtec societies were undergoing a process of social differentiation that is reflected in the appearance of some public buildings in towns such as Yucuita, Etlatongo, Tayata and Huamelulpan in Highland Mixteca; and Cerro de las Minas and Huajuapan in Lowland Mixteca. The increasingly defined stratification of the Mixtec populations of this period is a reflection of the process that gave way to the foundation of the first states in the area based on chiefdom societies. The political structure at the end of the Late Cruz phase in Highland Mixteca was made up of a series of states that dominated small territories where numerous hierarchically organized populations existed. The hierarchy of the populations has been observed in the amount of architectural monuments that each locality housed, which has allowed inferring the type of relationships that existed between the center of regional relevance and the second line towns. A well-known case is that of Huamelulpan, whose rapid growth relegated Tayata — which was one of the largest Mixtec towns of the Middle Preclassic — to a second position, causing population contraction and the cessation of architectural works in Tayata around the 3rd century BC.

The urban revolution in La Mixteca was contemporary with the process that led to the formation of the Zapotec state headed by Monte Albán. The Zapotec populations of Los Valles that emerged in the Middle Preclassic were comparable in size to the Mixtec populations of the highlands. However, the history of Monte Albán would mark several differences with the Mixtec lordships, among them the spatial dimensions under state rule. In La Mixteca, the states dominated small territories that sometimes did not exceed one hundred square kilometers in area. In contrast, Monte Albán occupied a much larger territory and early on undertook an expansionist campaign that led it to occupy the Cañada de Cuicatlán and some regions of the Sierra Juárez. The influence of Monte Albán in La Mixteca during the Preclassic is evident: in several localities of Highland Mixteca there are ceramic productions with similar characteristics to those of the Zapotec ceramics of Los Valles: Huamelulpan produced urns that were similar to those produced in Monte Albán, and in that same region, inscriptions in the Zapotec writing system have been found. However, there is no evidence that Monte Albán dominated the Mixtec politically, so it is plausible that these influences are a reflection of a single cultural process that gave rise to both civilizations.

Classic archaeological sites in La Mixteca. Red dots indicate sites with ñuiñe evidence, blue dots represent other settlements in the region.

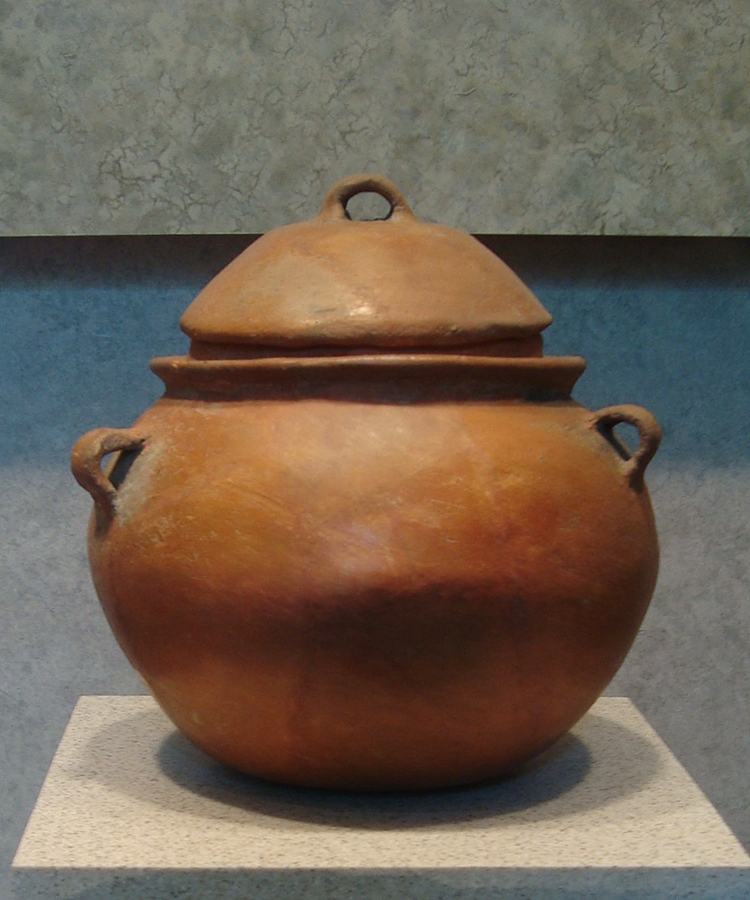
Ceramic vessel from Cerro de las Minas. It is currently in the National Museum of Anthropology in Mexico City.

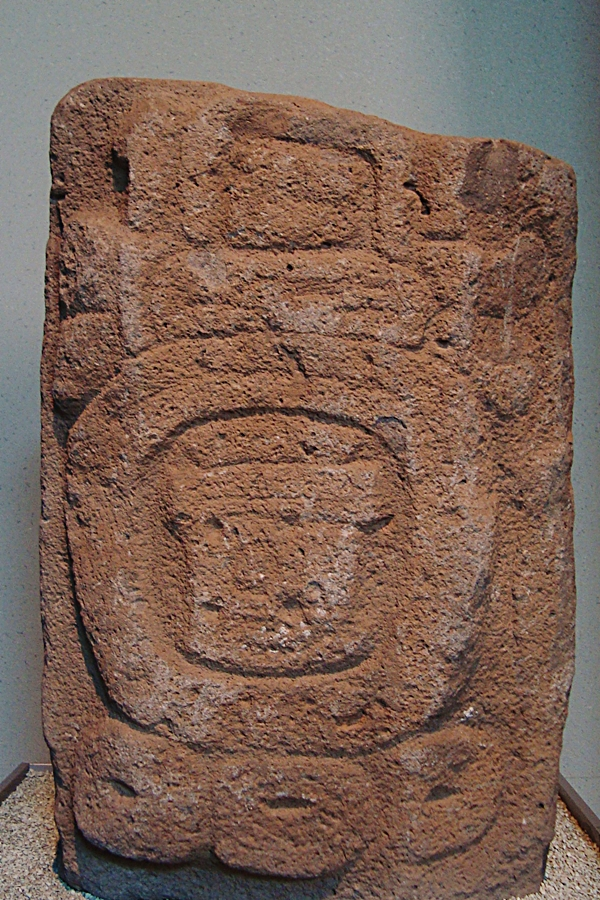
A writing system called ñuiñe was developed in the Low Mixtec and it was very similar to Zapotec. The system became obsolete at the end of the Classic, when the homonymous artistic style also disappeared. In the image, stela from Huajuapan de León, Classic period. Collection of the MNA.

=== Classic Period ===
In the Mixtec culture, the Classic Period covers approximately the period between the 1st and 8th/9th centuries, with some variations according to the local history of each cultural area. Throughout Mesoamerica, cities of considerable dimensions and populations appear, with a clear specialization in the use of space and a social differentiation that is reflected in the diverse characteristics of the remains of the constructions. The Teotihuacan cultural influence is felt throughout the region, although only in some localities has the political and military domination of this metropolis been proven. The commercial ties became stronger between the different towns, already specialized in the production of certain goods for subsistence and sumptuary use.

As with the Preclassic period, the history of the Mixtec people in this phase of urbanization and the emergence of large states in Mesoamerica is little known. The Classic period in La Mixteca is marked by a process of substitution of the centers of political power throughout the region. Some characteristics of the Preclassic Mixtec states were inherited by their successors, among them the fragmentation of control over the territory among numerous hierarchically organized populations. In Highland Mixteca, Yucuita was replaced by Yucuñudahui as the seat of political power in the Nochixtlán valley; in other areas of Highland Mixteca, such as the Huamelulpan valley, this replacement did not occur, and Huamelulpan, which was one of the main towns during the Late Ramos phase, collapsed and lost an important part of its population, although the occupation of the city was continuous until the Postclassic. Throughout Highland Mixteca, population density increased, which led to the appearance of new urban localities in the valleys and mountains of the area. Among these are Monte Negro, Diquiyú, Cerro Jazmín in the center; and the Poblano river basin in the valley of Coixtlahuaca.

Although during the Preclassic period the urbanization process in La Mixteca and Los Valles had similar characteristics, for the Classic period the situation is different. Some works want to see in Yucuñudahui a Mixtec counterpart of Monte Albán. However, unlike the Zapotec society, with a single capital in Monte Albán, the Mixtecs were organized in small city-states that rarely exceeded twelve thousand inhabitants. According to Spores, Yucuñudahui was only one of many states that had their headquarters in the valley of Nochixtlán. On the other hand, in some cases the population density in La Mixteca was higher than in the valleys, as shown by the study of settlement patterns in Highland Mixteca. During the Mixtec Classic period, there were signs of a clearly stratified society and the characteristic features of the Mixtec religion were consolidated, among them, the cult of rain and lightning, condensed in the divinization of Dzahui.

On the other hand, a cultural complex with its own characteristics appeared in Lowland Mixteca, which spread throughout that area and the eastern part of the current state of Guerrero. The main center of this culture — which Paddock called ñuiñe to differentiate it from the Mixtec culture — was Cerro de las Minas (to the north of Huajuapan de León), a population whose beginnings date back to the Late Preclassic, but whose flourishing occurred from the second century of the Christian era. Cerro de las Minas has urban characteristics similar to the cities of Highland Mixteca. It was built around a group of several small plazas around which the rest of the population was distributed — and this is one of the differences of Mixtec urbanism in comparison with other Mesoamerican towns whose cities were organized around a single large main plaza. The space on which it was built was modified by the construction of terraces, called coo yuu (lama-bordo), so the city has numerous stairways. Cerro de las Minas was embellished with numerous reliefs containing inscriptions in a writing system that is little known to date, called ñuiñe. The similarities between these inscriptions and those on the Zapotec stelae of Monte Albán suggest a very strong relationship between Los Valles and Lowland Mixteca during the Classic.

Other sites where vestiges of the ñuiñe culture have been found in Lowland Mixteca are San Pedro and San Pablo Tequixtepec, the Tonalá cave and the Colossal Bridge in Oaxaca; Acatlán de Osorio, Hermengildo Galeana and San Pablo Anicano (Puebla); and in numerous sites in La Montaña de Guerrero, such as Copanatoyac, Malinaltepec, Zoyatlán, Metlatónoc and Huamuxtitlán. In many cases they are ceramic samples with similar characteristics to those produced in Cerro de las Minas: fragments of vessels with little or no decoration, made with a brownish orange paste whose composition is similar to the Anaranjado Delgado pottery produced in Ixcaquixtla (Puebla), on the northern border of Lowland Mixteca. Other characteristic elements of the ñuiñe culture are the so-called colossal heads, small stone sculptures representing anthropomorphic heads — some of which are objects of worship by the indigenous communities of La Mixteca guerrerense; as well as certain urns representing the god of fire and a local version of Dzahui, whose characteristics were similar to the contemporary effigies of Pitao Cocijo produced by the Zapotecs of Los Valles.

During the Classic period, Lowland Mixteca was the seat of the main political centers of La Mixteca. The relay of Highland Mixteca states seems to have involved a series of events that destabilized the region politically, so that one of the main characteristics of the cities in Ñuiñe is their location in strategic points that facilitated their defense. In the same way that Huamelulpan and its satellites during the Late Preclassic; Cerro de las Minas, Diquiyú and other cities of Lowland Mixteca had fortifications and their administrative and religious buildings were built on the slopes of the hills, while the habitable areas were built in areas of relatively easier access. The war in Lowland Mixteca during the Classic period could have been caused not only by the competition between the states of the region, it is also probable that the rivalry with the Zapotecs of Los Valles was the cause of conflicts in the area. The warlike activity could also have been related to the ritualism of human sacrifices and the ballgame.

Towards the 7th century of the Christian era, most of the Mesoamerican towns faced serious crises that led to the decline of several of the most powerful states, among them Teotihuacan and Monte Alban. The Mixtec states also faced these widespread upheavals. In the Lowland Mixteca, the ñuiñe culture disappeared towards the end of the Classic period and several of the most important cities were partially or completely abandoned, both in the Lowland Mixteca and in the Highland Mixteca. However, there were not few cities such as Cerro Jazmín and Tilantongo that had a continuous occupation in the Classic and Postclassic transition.

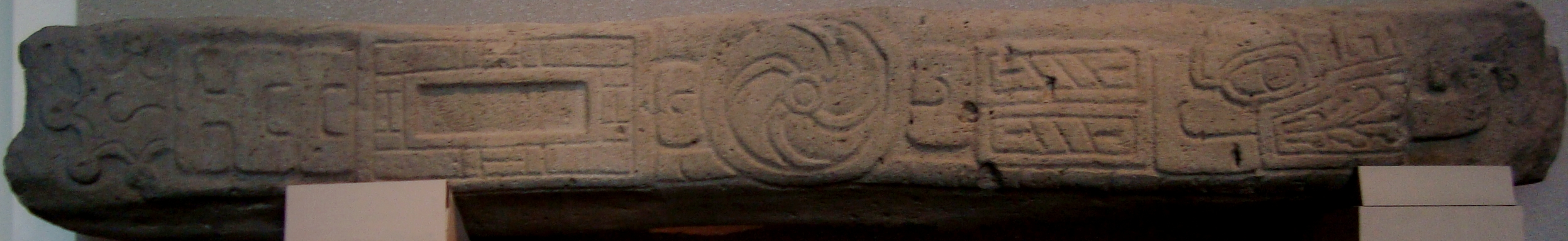
Lintel of Cerro de las Minas in Oaxaca. Classic Period (c. II-VII/VIII A.D.). National Museum of Anthropology.

=== Postclassic Period ===
Mesoamerican Postclassic Mixtec sites.

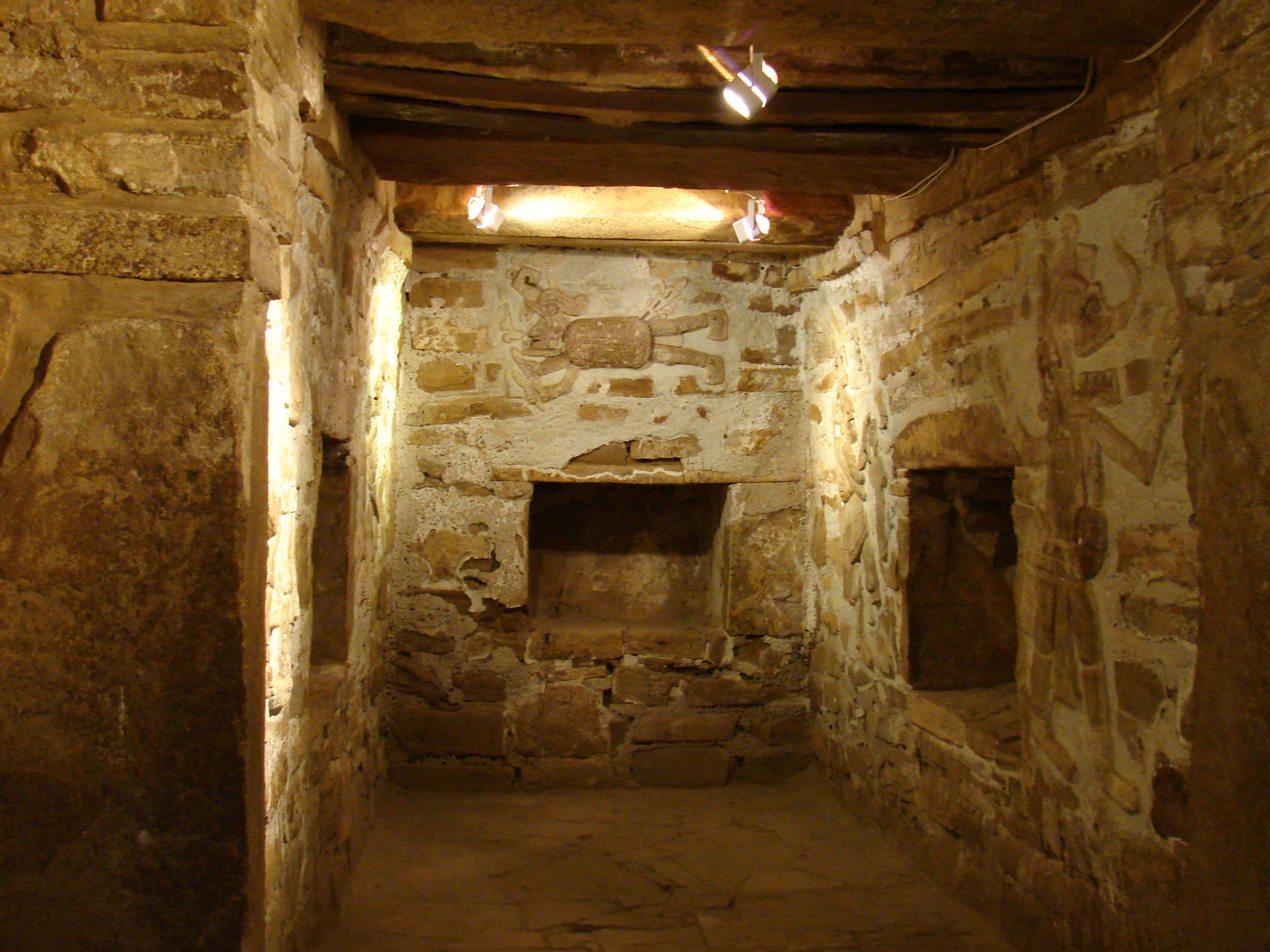
The stucco reliefs in Tomb 1 at Zaachila (Los Valles, Oaxaca) have a notable influence of Mixtec art. It is probable that the tomb belongs to a personage whose name is recorded in the Codex Nuttall. Tomb 1 of Zaachila, Central Valleys of Oaxaca, Late Postclassic.

The Postclassic is by far the best known period of pre-Hispanic Mixtec history, thanks to the preservation of oral history in colonial documents, but also to the codex that survived the destruction and the time after the arrival of the Spaniards in La Mixteca. In Mesoamerica, the Postclassic is marked by the flourishing of militaristic states. This does not mean that the societies of the previous stages had ignored the war, because the city-states of La Mixteca were protected by walls since the first millennium before the Christian era. What happens is that in this period, military activity seems to have taken on greater importance, as evidenced by the proliferation of paraphernalia associated with war and the cult of warrior deities throughout the region.

By the end of the eighth century, the ñuiñe style was beginning to decline in Lowland Mixteca, until it was gradually supplanted by the iconographic style of the Mixtec codex. The appearance of a new artistic style, accompanied by other cultural changes, such as the deep-rooted veneration of the Feathered Serpent and the construction of interethnic alliances, is not exclusive to the Mixtecs of the Early Postclassic period and has its antecedents in the political and social changes of the end of the Classic period in central Mexico. Throughout La Mixteca the population began to increase dramatically, although the most important demographic changes took place in Highland Mixteca. According to archaeological research, in Highland Mixteca the number of localities corresponding to the Natividad phase (10th-16th century A.D.) doubled with respect to those existing in the previous phase, that is, the Las Flores phase. In the same way, the area occupied by these localities increased significantly, reaching 10,450 hectares of urban area. These populations were organized in small states hostile to each other, each headed by a city of first importance that ruled over other settlements subject to its authority. The construction of a hierarchical structure in the relations between the head towns of the Mixtec lordships (called ñuu) and their satellites (called siqui) is constant in Mixtec history, although in this period it is accentuated due to the increase in population and the political strategies of the ruling elites.

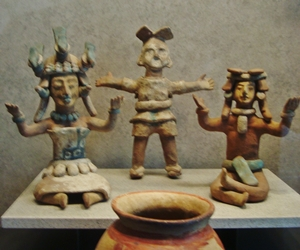
Figurines from the Coast of Oaxaca. This region was colonized by the Mixtecs during the early Mesoamerican Postclassic and was the scene of the flourishing of Yucu Dzaa (Tututepec).

From the Postclassic onwards, the Mixtecs had more extensive contacts with other populations of what is now Oaxaca, even in spite of linguistic and ethnic differences. A special case is the relationship between Mixtecs and Zapotecs, present in earlier times but now more intense. These relations were not only the result of their neighborliness in the same region, but also had economic and political purposes. The existence of a dense network of matrimonial alliances between Mixtec and Zapotec elites has been documented. For example, the Codex Nuttall tells of the marriage of Three Lizard with a Zapotec noblewoman from Zaachila, from whose marriage Cocijoeza was born, the future lord of that city who forged a combined Mixtec and Zapotec army and undertook an expansionist campaign in the Central Valleys of Oaxaca. There are numerous cities in Los Valles that show signs of Mixtec presence, including Monte Albán itself, where Alfonso Caso rescued the treasure from Tomb 7. The existence of works of Mixtec influence in Los Valles has been the subject of speculation by specialists. For some, it is evidence of Mixtec expansionism, so that the Zapotecs of Los Valles would have been politically dominated by the Mixtecs. However, it is also plausible that the matrimonial and political alliances between Mixtecs and Zapotecs have favored the diffusion of Mixtec art in the Zapotec territory, art that was used as an element of prestige by the elite of the Zapotec cities. Besides Monte Albán, other cities of Los Valles that show archaeological objects of Mixtec manufacture or influence are Mitla, Lambityeco, Yagul, Cuilapan and Zaachila; this last one was the most important of the Zapotec cities until its conquest by the Mexica in the 15th century.

==== Colonization of the Costa Region ====
Since the Preclassic, the coast of Oaxaca was occupied by Zapotec-speaking populations. According to glottochronological analyses, the separation between the Chatino language and the rest of the languages of the Zapotecan group must have occurred around the 5th century B.C. In contrast, the coastal varieties of Mixtec seem to have separated from the rest of the languages of Highland Mixteca around the 10th or 11th century CE, from which it can be inferred that the presence of the Mixtecs on the coast is relatively late. In light of these data and the analysis of archaeological artifacts found in the region, it is probable that the linguistic identity of the inhabitants of the lower Verde River valley during the Preclassic and Classic periods was Zapotecan, displaced from central Oaxaca. Although the relationship between the lower Verde River valley and Highland Mixteca is not completely ruled out due to geographical proximity, the presence of the Mixtecs in the Coastal region is the product of a late colonization.

The massive movement of the Mixtecs to the towns of La Costa caused a change in the power relations in these communities. The Zapotec towns, like the Chatinos, came under the political domination of the Mixtec elites. The Mixtec chiefdoms of La Costa had, for this reason, a multi-ethnic population, as in the case of Tututepec. Although this locality was occupied before the Postclassic period, it shows signs of a spectacular demographic growth between the 9th and 10 centuries, related precisely to the Mixtec migration from the highlands. From the 11th century onward, Tututepec would play a fundamental role in Mixtec history, being the first seat of Eight Deer, a Mixtec lord who would dominate a territory of more than 40,000 square kilometers after unifying numerous hostile states, defeating them militarily and establishing political alliances with them.

==== Chiefdom of Eight Deer ====
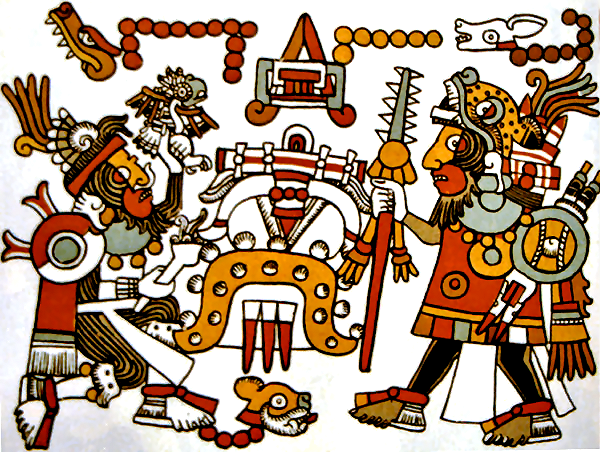
Eight Deer and Four Jaguar seal their alliance on the 13 lizard day of the 7 house year, in a ritual in which they offer quails as an offering. The following day, 1 wind, the priest Eight Death-Eagle Eye, imposes on Eight Deer the turquoise bezote that identifies him as tecuhtli, a rank of the Nahua nobility of central Mexico. Page 52 of the Codex Nuttall. Highland Mixteca, 14th century. Now in the possession of the British Museum.

The political fragmentation of the Mixtec people in pre-Hispanic times was a constant that transcended the centuries. However, between the 11th and 12th centuries CE, numerous lordships in the three Mixtecs formed a unit under the rule of Eight Deer Jaguar Claw (in Mixtec, Iya Naacua Teyusi Ñaña; Tilantongo, 1063-1115). This character is fundamental in the postclassic history of Mesoamerica, not only for the power he acquired in La Mixteca, but also for the relations he established with other populations, especially with the Nahua people of central Mexico.

Eight Deer was born of the second marriage of Five Lizard-Dzahui Ndicahndíí, priest of the Temple of Heaven that was located in Tilantongo (in Mixtec, Ñuu Tnoo Huahi Andehui). He was, therefore, outside the line of succession to the throne of the lordship of Tilantongo. Thanks to the prestige obtained in military campaigns — according to Codex Nuttall, the first of them occurred in 1071, when Eight Deer was eight years old — Eight Deer occupied in 1083 the throne of Tututepec (in Mixtec: Yucudzáa), in the valley of the lower Verde River, near the Pacific coast. Later, Eight Deer sealed an alliance with the Toltecs, from whom he received the rank of tecuhtli in Ñuu Cohyo. On the 13 Lizard day of the 7 House year (1097), Eight Deer met with Four Jaguar who was an important ally in his rise to power.

The alliance between Eight Deer and Four Jaguar helped legitimize Eight Deer's rise to the throne of Tilantongo after the death of lord Two Rain, the local ruler. To avoid the probable claims of Two Rain's descendants, Eight Deer eliminated them all and became the sole heir to the lordship. The conquest of Lugar del Bulto de Xipe, where a branch of the royal lineage of Tilantongo was located, was of special importance. In Lugar del Bulto de Xipe ruled Eleven Wind-Bloody Jaguar, married to Six Lizard-Jade Fan (half-sister of Eight Deer) and Six Monkey-War Quexquémitl (heir to the throne of Jaltepec). On the 12 Monkey day of the 11 House year (1101), Eight Deer defeated the defenders of Lugar del Bulto de Xipe. It is unknown how Six Monkey and Eleven Wind died. Their sons Ten Dog-Eagle of Burning Tobacco and Six House-String of Flint were sacrificed, the former by gladiatorial sacrifice and the latter by ritual arrowing. In this way, Eight Deer added the important lordships of Jaltepec and Lugar del Bulto de Xipe to the territories under his dominion.

During his reign in Tilantongo, Eight Deer managed to conquer around one hundred Mixtec lordships. In addition, he established an important network of alliances through his marriages. Among others, his wives were the ladies Thirteen Serpent-Flowered Serpent, daughter of the first marriage of Eleven Wind of Lugar del Bulge de Xipe (year of 13 Cane, 1103); Six Eagle-Spiderweb Jaguar and Ten Zopilote-Conch Quexquémitl. His first son was born in the year 6 House (1109) of his marriage with Six Eagle and was heir to the throne of Tilantongo. Eight Deer died sacrificed in 1115, after being defeated by a coalition of rebel lords that were under his dominion. The rebel alliance was led by Four Wind, the only son of Eleven Wind and Six Monkey who had escaped death after the fall of Lugar del Bulto de Xipe. Eight Deer's remains were probably deposited in the royal grotto of Chalcatongo. At his death, the Mixtec kingdom dissolved into numerous states, ending the only period of political unity in the pre-Hispanic history of the region.

==== Mexica Conquest ====
Upon the death of Eight Deer, his sons inherited some of the most important lordships that were part of the kingdom under the rule of Tilantongo. In other Mixtec cities, the old local elites regained their power. The reestablishment of the old system of political organization in small states implied the revival of conflicts between some of them or the establishment of alliances or confederations. By this time, La Mixteca — and especially Highland Mixteca — was one of the most prosperous regions of Mesoamerica. It exported luxury goods to other regions, such as polychrome ceramics, featherwork, goldsmithing, rock crystal, bone, and wood carvings, as well as livelihood assets typical of tropical regions and temperate climate zones.

La Mixteca is strategically located between the central part of Mexico and the Mesoamerican southeast, so that in the time of expansionism of the Triple Alliance formed by Mexico-Tenochtitlan, Tetzcoco, and Tlacopan —confederation called Excan Tlatoloyan — quickly awakened the interests of the Mexica and their allies in the Texcoco Lake basin. By the second half of the 15th century, a large part of La Mixteca was under the political as well as military power of Tenochtitlan. Some of the most important cities in the region were converted into centers that concentrated the tribute demanded by the conquerors, among them Coixtlahuaca, which until before the Mexica conquest had become one of the largest cities in Mesoamerica. The advance of the Mexica in Highland Mixteca allowed them to dominate also the Central Valleys of Oaxaca, in their eagerness to assure their predominance in the commercial routes between the Mexican highlands and the Pacific coast of Guatemala and Chiapas. The Mexica also tried to conquer the Mixtec coast and the Isthmus of Tehuantepec, but were defeated by an alliance between the Zapotecs and Mixtecs in their campaigns against Tututepec — which at the time dominated a territory of approximately 25,000 square kilometers in the Costa Chica of Oaxaca — as well as in those carried out in the Isthmus. Of special importance was the Mixtec-Zapotec victory at Guiengola, a fortress where the Mexica were definitively defeated by the defenders of the Isthmus of Tehuantepec.

=== Spanish Conquest ===
The arrival of the Spaniards on the coast of Veracruz in 1519 provoked different types of reactions. Several populations saw the Spaniards as an opportunity for liberation, among them the Zempoaltecs and the Tlaxcaltecs. After the fall of Mexico-Tenochtitlan in 1521, the Spaniards and their indigenous allies concentrated their attacks on other populations such as the Mixtecs. But unlike what happened in central Mexico, most of the Mixtecs established agreements with the Spaniards, giving rise to a process of mutual cultural adaptation that in turn allowed the Mixtecs to retain many of their traditions and customs, such as their language, commercial practices, agricultural methods, etc. Only some parts of La Mixteca militarily resisted the Spanish conquest, as in the case of Tututepec.

== Society ==
=== Kinship system ===
According to the available data, they have stated that in the Postclassic, the Mixtecs had a Hawaiian-type kinship system. This means that it was a bilateral system that allowed, among other things, for individuals to have inheritance rights to the property and titles of both their progenitors, as well as the participation of women in high spheres of power, as shown by the 951 noblewomen recorded in the pre-Columbian Mixtec codex. In a Hawaiian kinship system, a person designates his father and all his male uncles with the same term. Likewise, he uses the same term to refer to his mother and all his aunts. As a consequence, his brothers and the sons of his uncles are referred to by the same word.

=== Social classes ===
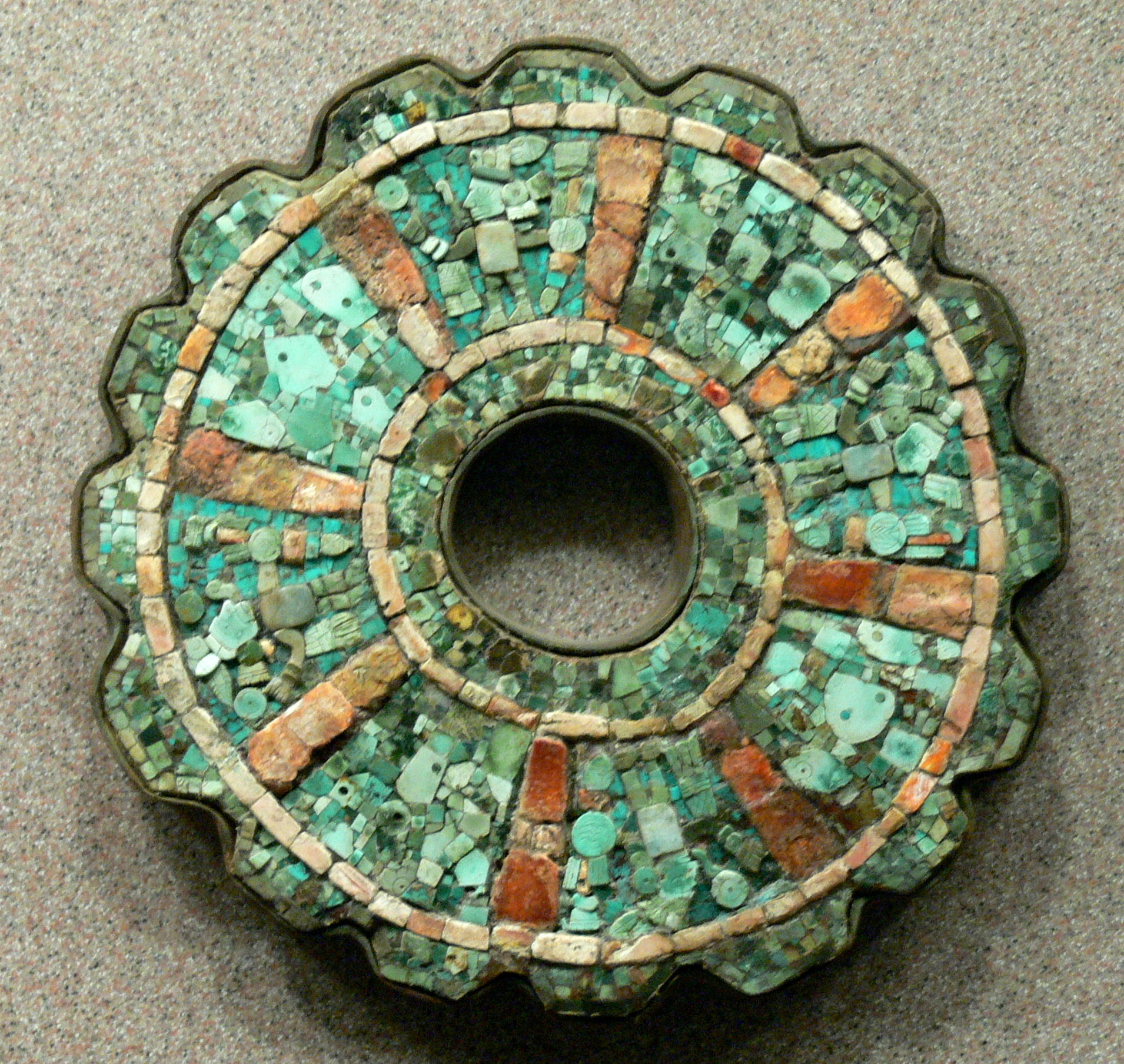
For the Mixtecs, turquoise was a precious material, destined for the use of the elite and related to the Sun. Turquoise disc from the Postclassic period.

During pre-Hispanic times, Mixtec society was characterized by its high hierarchy. However, differences did not appear spontaneously. The process of stratification was parallel to the development of Mixtec society. The strata of Mixtec society have their origin in the sedentism of this people and were influenced by the political, historical, economic and cultural processes that took place in La Mixteca since the 16th century B.C. At the beginning, Mixtec populations had an incipient stratification. The remains of the Late and Middle Preclassic populations do not present great differences when comparing some dwellings with others, and the use of the constructions of these settlements does not seem to be too specialized. The goods available to the Mixtecs in those centuries seem to have been limited, and there is no evidence to clearly distinguish the living areas of the elite from the rest of the population, although it is possible to admit the existence of a gradation in the levels of welfare among the inhabitants of the same locality.

The transition to the Classic marks the development of full urban life in this region and in most of Mesoamerica. The consolidation of state organizations in La Mixteca implied a process of greater differentiation that tended to be legitimized through the use of ideology and alliances at the elite level with the purpose of reproducing the inequalities between the strata of society. The emergence of the ñuiñe style in Lowland Mixteca — the most prosperous area of La Mixteca in the Classic period — is a sign of the will of the ruling groups to make clear the differences between themselves and the rest of the people. Colonial Spanish chronicles speak of numerous strata of Mixtec society, however, all of them can be reduced to the following major groups:

- yya is the title given to the lord of each Mixtec chiefdom;
- dzayya yya was the group constituted by the Mixtec nobility, they were the same category as the king;
- tay ñuu, the free people;
- tay situndayu, serfs;
- tay sinoquachi and dahasaha, servants and slaves respectively.

In general, there was not much chance of moving up the social ladder. Marriages between dzayya yya implied that this group would always retain their privileged position and inherit it to their descendants. The nobles of different Mixtec villages practiced endogamy, which also generated a complicated network of alliances at the elite level that served as a means of reproducing social inequality as well as maintaining order in the region. The free people, the tay ñuu, owned themselves and the product of their work on the land, which was communally owned. The terrazgueros, on the other hand, were people who, because of the war, had lost the power over the product of their work and had to pay tribute to the nobles. The last groups in the social scale of the Mixtecs had fewer rights than the others and their lives could be disposed of by the nobility for whatever purpose was necessary.

=== Political organization ===
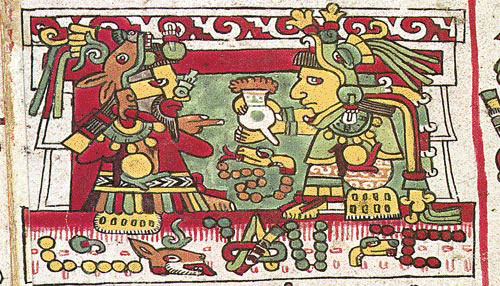
In the image, the marriage of Eight Deer Jaguar Claw and Eleven Serpent-Flowered Serpent. This is the first marriage of the yyá of Yucu Dzáa. Through this marriage yuhuitayu was established to have integrated Yucu Dzáa and Lugar del Bulto de Xipe in a political alliance. This event, together with the extermination of the heirs to the throne of Ñuu Tnoo, allowed Eight Deer to assert himself as lord of the latter site, the most powerful being Diana ñuu of Highland Mixteca at the time.

One of the most accentuated characteristics of the political system of the pre-Columbian Mixtecs was the fragmentation into numerous states that dominated small territories and that on several occasions were in conflict with each other. From the Middle Preclassic a hierarchical structure appears among the populations that were part of the same state. The place that each community occupied in this structure is manifested in the number of monumental constructions that each one of them possessed. On the other hand, the power of each small city or town was not static, but was in constant play in the face of competition between the different population centers. Thus, it can be understood that in the transition from the Preclassic to the Classic, some populations ceded their privileged position to others, as happened with Yucuita, replaced by Yucuñudahui.

The ñuu was the primary unit of political relations among the Postclassic Mixtecs, comparable to the Nahua concept of altepetl. Ñuu can be translated from the Mixtec language in a variety of terms, such as people, community, place, or town. A ñuu could or could not be the head of a state. The ñuu were subdivided into siqui (wards), comparable to the Nahua calpulli. The political life of the Mixtec states unfolded in a network known as yuhuitayu (the seat, petate). This political unit consisted of the dynastic union of two local lineages through the marriage of a yya toniñe (noble lord) and a yya dzehe toniñe (noble lady). The ruling elites resorted to numerous strategies in order to maintain their power. One of them was the establishment of elite alliances. Alliances were usually sealed by marriage between members of noble lineages, which often involved incestuous marriages. The establishment of kinship affinities was usually carried out with the purpose of establishing relationships with the most prestigious lineages of the Mixtec nation and even with foreign nobility, as shown by the recurrent marriages between members of the Mixtec and Zapotec royalty throughout the more than twenty centuries of pre-Hispanic history of these populations.

=== Militarism ===
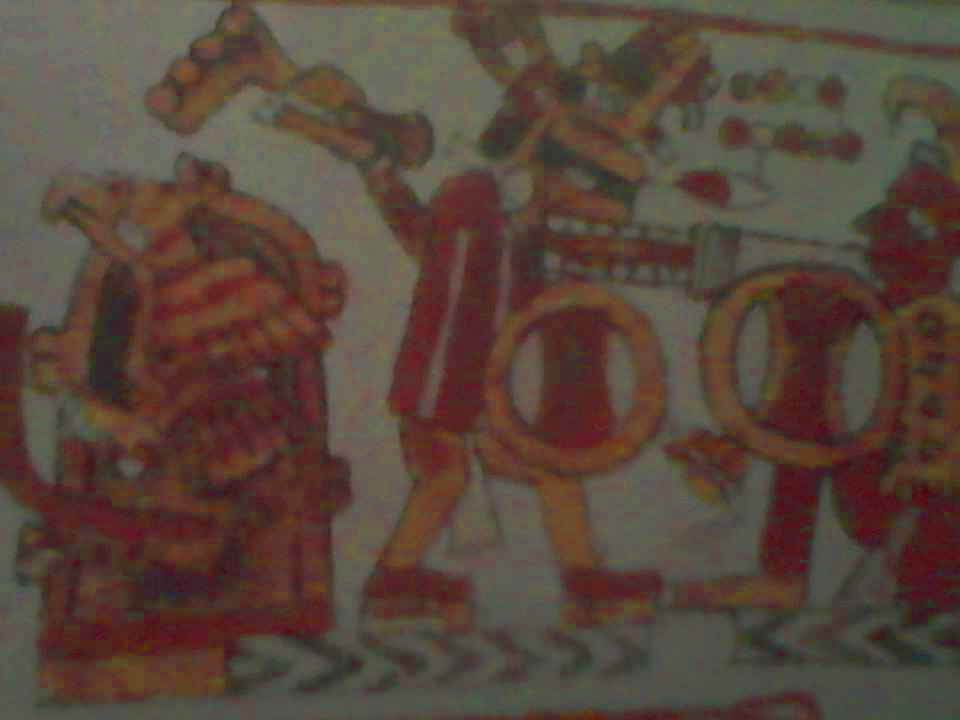
In the center is a warrior carrying the common weapon of the Mixtecs and Zapotecs. Codex Nuttal, page 10.

The Mixtecs developed their own arts of war, invented their own weapons and carried out their own conquests, as well as defended their territories from any invaders. Their conflicts and alliances were mainly between Mixtec cities and Zapotec towns. The most prominent hero in Mixtec history was Eight Deer, ruler of Tututepec and conqueror; his exploits are recounted in the Codex Nuttal.

The codex give us a glimpse of the weapons and uniforms used by the Mixtecs.

- Long-range attack weapons: Among the long distance attack weapons used by the Mixtecs were the typical bows and arrows, whose tips must have been made of obsidian or flint. The use of the atlatl was also present, a common weapon throughout Mesoamerica.
- Close-range attack weapons: Among the melee weapons, the Mixtecs fought with a variety of clubs and spears, some similar to the Mexica tepoztopilli, but smaller. A weapon that appears frequently in the codex is striking; it is a wooden stick bent at a 90° angle, with stone blades (whether flint, flint or obsidian) on top; this weapon seems to have been representative of the Mixtec and Zapotec area.
- Military clothing: Warriors are depicted in the codex wearing zoomorphic costumes, from jaguar skins, to eagle-headed helmets, to deer skins. Zoomorphic uniforms were common in Mesoamerica, the most representative examples being the Mexica orders of eagle and jaguar warriors.
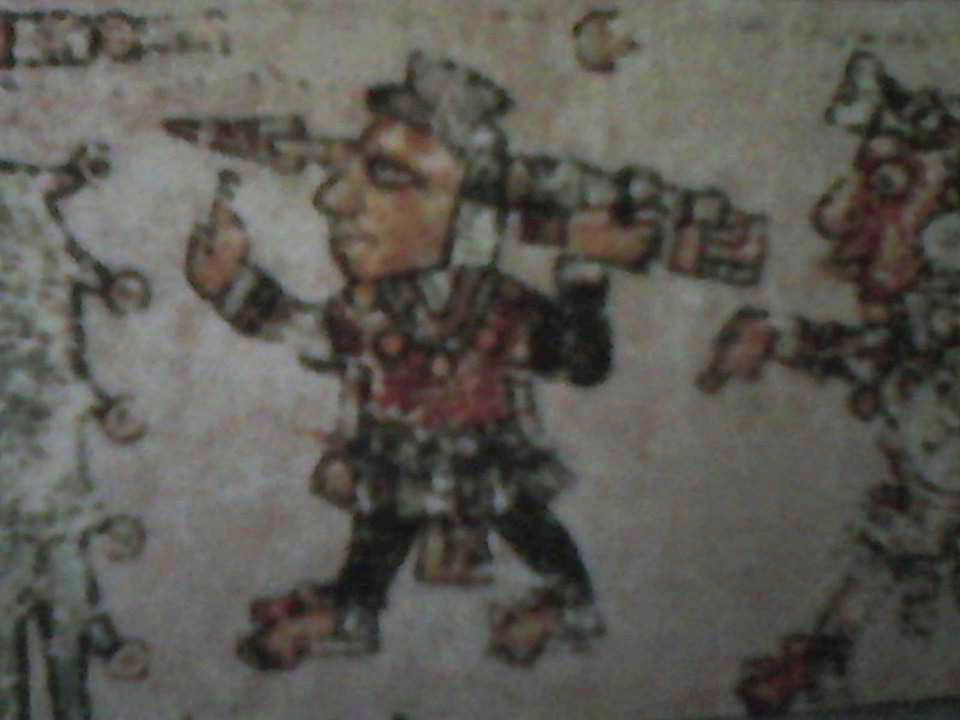
Mixtec warrior throwing darts with an atlatl. Codex Colombino. Page 1.

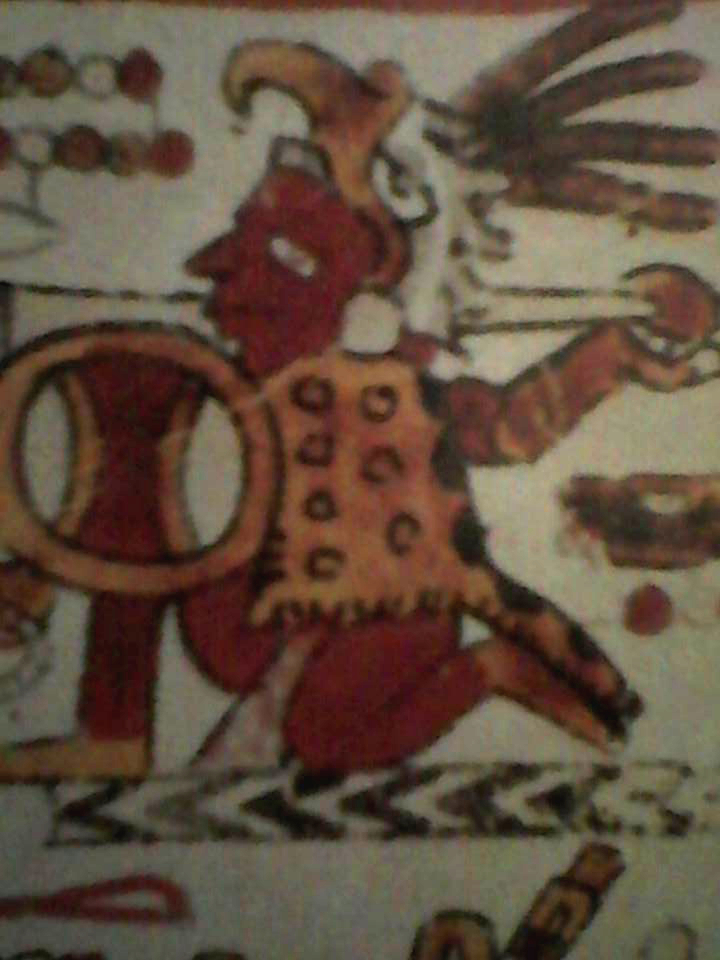
A Mixtec warrior wearing a jaguar skin and a helmet in the shape of a bald eagle's head. Codex Selden, p. 17.

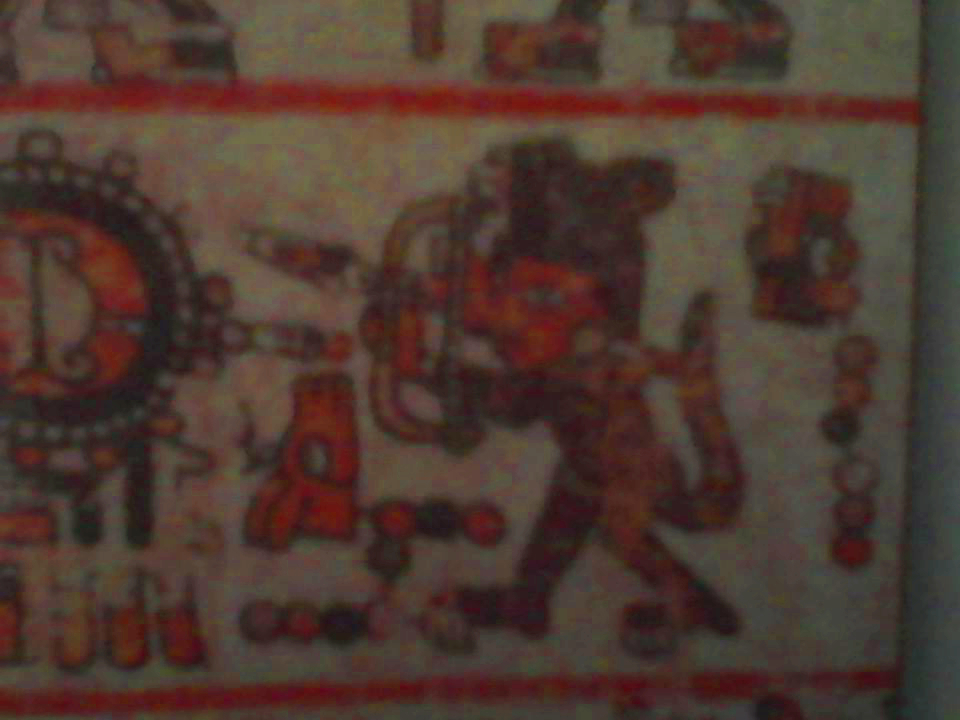
Mixtec archer disguised as a deer, as shown in Codex Bodley.

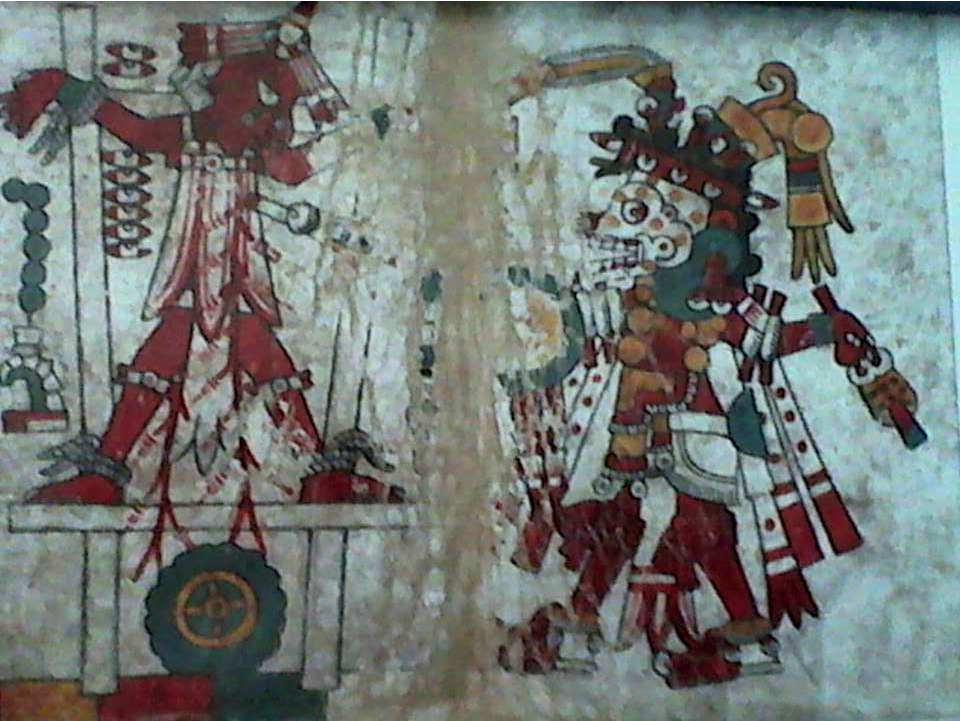
A ruler is executed by a priest of Xipe-totec. Codex Nuttal.

== Economic activities ==
=== Economy ===
Like the rest of the populations of pre-Columbian Mesoamerica, the subsistence of the Mixtecs was based on agriculture. The ecological and topographical conditions of this people's territory conditioned the development of certain crops adapted to the diversity of environments in La Mixteca. Of course, the most important of these people's crops was maize, to which were associated other crops of vital importance in the diet of the Mesoamericans. Among them were several varieties of beans, chili, and squash. In places where the climate permitted, there were crops of species that were not necessarily used for food. These included cotton — which was adapted to the semi-tropical climates of Lowland Mixteca, the Cañada de Cuicatlán, and the Oaxacan coast — and cocoa, which was grown in areas with higher humidity.

One of the major problems faced by the Mixtecs in pre-Columbian times was the abrupt relief of La Mixteca and the scarcity of water in the region. Agriculture offered better yields in the intermontane valleys of Highland Mixteca, at least in comparison with the warmer and drier Lowland Mixteca and Coastal Mixteca. Evidence of artificial terraces have been found on the mountain slopes surrounding valleys such as Tlaxiaco. The purpose of the terraces was to increase the scarce arable land by intentionally flattening the slopes, as well as to make better use of the available water. On the other hand, alternative crops, such as pitayo, were developed in the drier areas.

The rugged geography of La Mixteca forced its inhabitants to develop a set of technologies that allowed for profitable agriculture. On the slopes of the Mixtec mountains they built terraces called coo yuu (lama-bordo). To do this, they used masonry dams to conserve the unwashed soil of the mountain slopes. According to modern farmers in the Nochixtlán valley, the use of Mixtec terraces allows the formation of a platform that produces good maize harvests after 3 or 4 years. The coo yuu required maintenance, as erosion and agricultural use of the terraces caused the nutritious soil to wear away. In Highland Mixteca, caliche obtained from mines in the region was used for these tasks. The ancient Mixtecs used the slash-and-burn system to gain land for cultivation. In other words, they cleared the original vegetation from the hillsides and proceeded to burn it in order to use the plant remains as fertilizer for their crops. This caused serious deforestation that affected a large part of the Mixtec territory, considered one of the most eroded in the Mexican Republic.

=== Supplementary activities ===
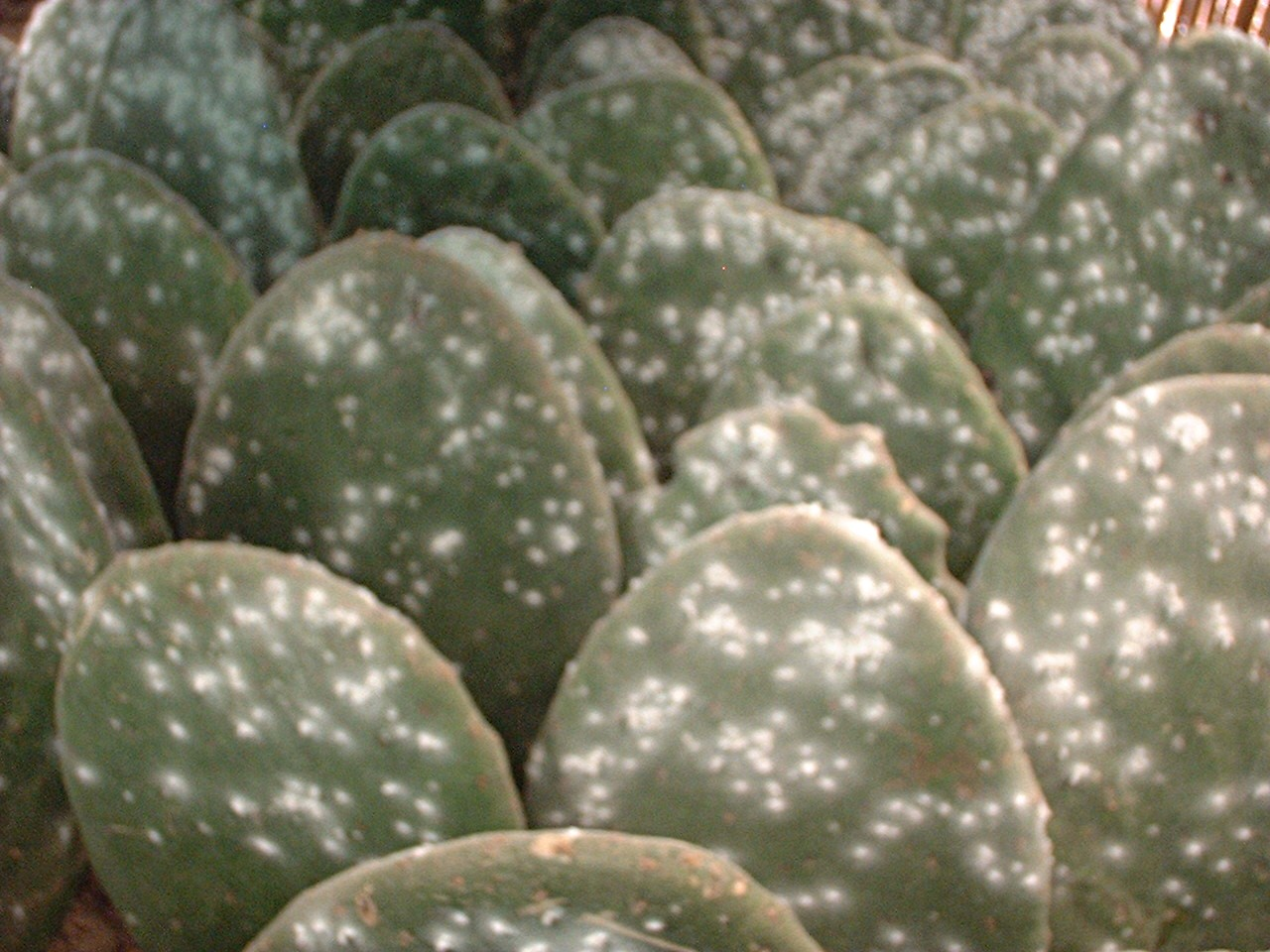
Nopales infected with cochineal. The cochineal crop was of vital economic importance to the ancient Mixtecs and other populations of the Oaxacan area. Although decimated by the appearance of chemical dyes, its use continues to the present day.

A very small number of animal species were domesticated in Mesoamerica. The guajolote (Meleagris gallopavo) and the xoloitzcuintle are two of them, and their presence is proven in all parts of Mesoamerica. Both were a source of meat consumed on a small scale in indigenous societies. In La Mixteca, in addition, the breeding of the cochineal, a parasite exploited by the textile industry, was developed. The species is a parasite of the nopal cactus. It still breeds in the temperate climates of Highland Mixteca and other parts of northern and central Oaxaca. From it is obtained a dye called carmine or grana cochinilla, appreciated for its intense red color. Cochineal cultivation remained one of the main activities in the region until the 19th century, when the discovery of synthetic dyes displaced it.

The basis of the economy of all Mesoamerican populations was agriculture. The Mixtecs, like the rest of the Mesoamerican populations, resorted to hunting, harvesting, and fishing to supplement their diet and cover other needs. One of the advantages of the Mixtec territory was its great diversity of microclimates, so that many of the lordships that developed in the area were practically self-sufficient in subsistence.

The inhabitants of La Mixteca were incorporated into the vast Mesoamerican trade network. In addition to the fruits of agricultural labor and cochineal, the Mixtecs traded precious materials and manufactured goods. From very early dates, they were integrated as producers of minerals, among them magnetite. It has been proven that during the Middle Preclassic (12th-5th centuries BC), the Red pottery on Bayo de Tayata (Highland Mixteca) was a product of trade with the Olmecs of the Gulf Coast of Mexico.

== Culture ==
=== Language and writing ===
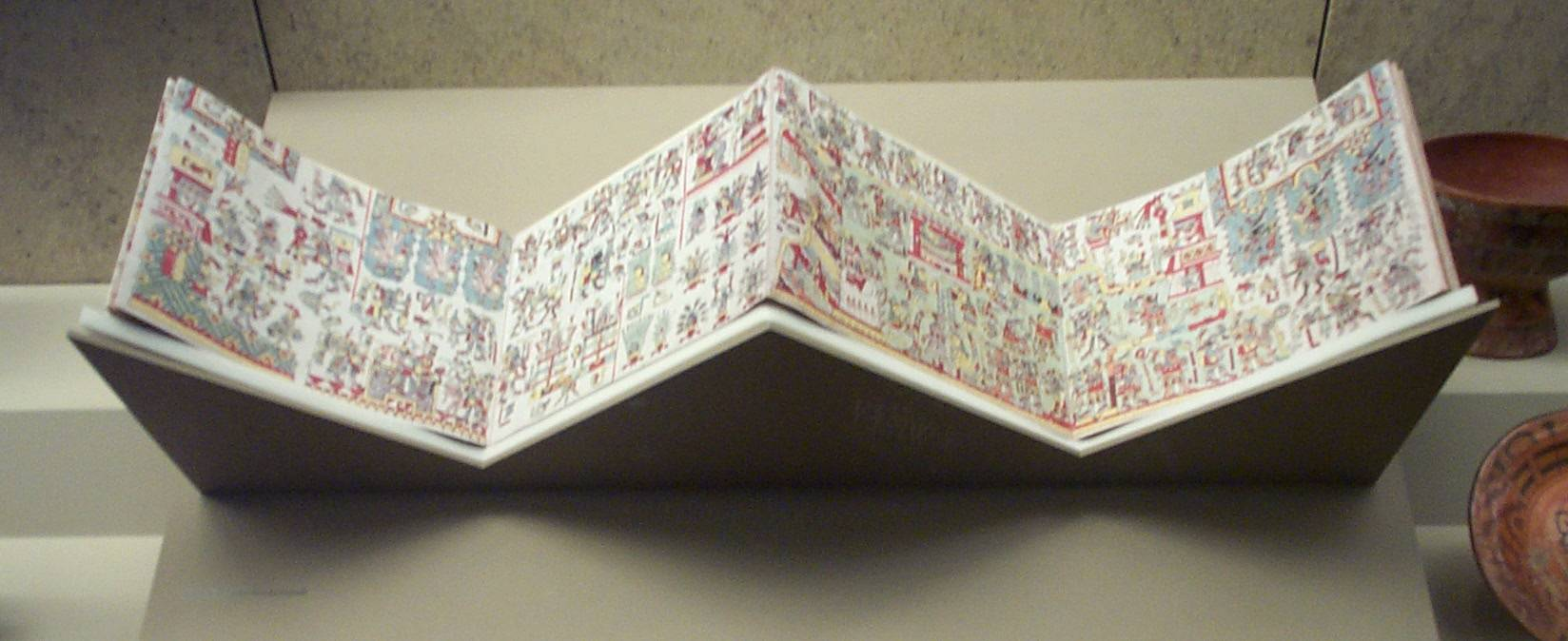
Codex Nuttal. Mixtec Culture.

The Mixtecs already spoke numerous varieties of the Mixtec language before the arrival of the Spaniard, with varying degrees of mutual intelligibility. According to Spores (1967 and 2007) by the Preclassic the language spoken in the region was the Proto-Mixtecan language, from which not only all the Mixtec languages known today derive, but also Trique, spoken by members of the homonymous people in the southern part of Highland Mixteca. The degrees of divergence among the numerous Mixtec languages of today are a product of the history of their speakers: for example, according to glottochronological analysis, the Coastal variety of Mixtec diverged from the nuclear Mixtec of the highlands around the 10th or 11th century CE, which coincides with the late colonization of the Costa Chica by the Mixtecs.

The Dominican friars who were in charge of the evangelization of Oaxaca established for the first time a phonetic writing of the Mixtec language. To the friars Antonio de los Reyes and Francisco de Alvarado we owe the edition of the first grammar in the language spoken in Highland Mixteca at the time of the Conquest. The variety collected by the Dominicans seems to correspond to the one used in Yucundaa (Teposcolula), which could have served as a lingua franca in the region. The spelling of the Teposcolula variety was later adapted to write the Mixtec language, whose name at the time of the Conquest was dzaha dzahui.

Like other populations of Mesoamerica, the Mixtecs also cultivated literary forms. They had a pictographic writing system, of which pre-Hispanic testimonies are preserved as the Codex Nuttall (Tonindeye), Selden, Vindobonensis, Becker I and Colombino. Except for the latter, which is in Mexico, the rest of the pre-Columbian codex created by the Mixtecs that survived destruction are in museums and libraries in Europe. These codex served as mnemonic instruments, so that the paintings on their pages could be translated into an oral text by the act of those who knew the keys to interpret them.

=== Writing ===
Like almost all Mesoamerican societies, the Mixtecs developed a writing system. The first indications of the use of writing in the Mixtec area correspond to Highland Mixteca, in the Late Preclassic (5th century B.C.-A.D. 1st century). In Huamelulpan some lintels have been located with calendrical inscriptions that could be the names of some leaders of the ancient Mixtec city. However, these inscriptions are in the Zapotec writing system, from which originated the various systems used later in central Mesoamerica during the Classic and Postclassic periods. The flourishing of the Lowland Mixteca in the Classic period also brought the development of the ñuiñe script, although its similarity with the Zapotec script of Monte Albán complicates the identification of its area of diffusion. Towards the beginning of the Postclassic (9th century) the so-called Mixtec writing appears, which is part of a great stylistic current called Mixteca-Puebla style or international style of the Mesoamerican Postclassic. This writing is basically pictographic, although there are many hieroglyphic and ideographic elements that complement it. Mixtec writing served as a channel for the preservation of the beliefs of this people and some aspects of their history. It is due to Alfonso Caso the demonstration of the Mixtec authorship of the codex that today are part of the so-called Mixtec group, which for a long time were attributed to the Mexica or Maya.

=== Religion ===
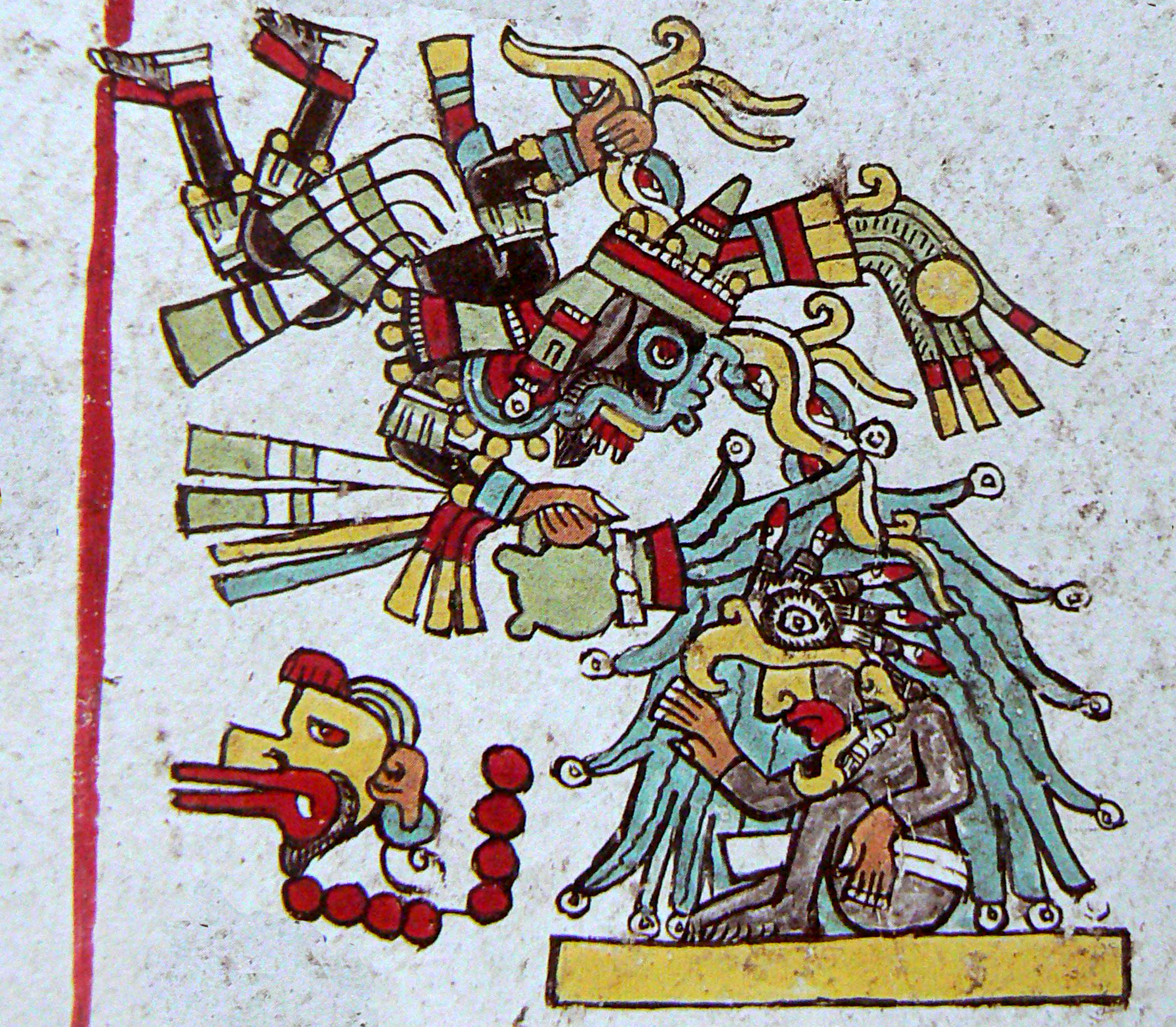
This image from the Codex Vindobonensis, Dzahui showers Nine Wind-Coo Dzahui with rain. Dzahui was the main deity of the Mixtecs in pre-Hispanic times. Nine Wind is the calendrical name of the Feathered Serpent among the Mixtecs. The cult to the stones of Dzahui, or Savi, as it is pronounced today, continues in some areas of La Mixteca.

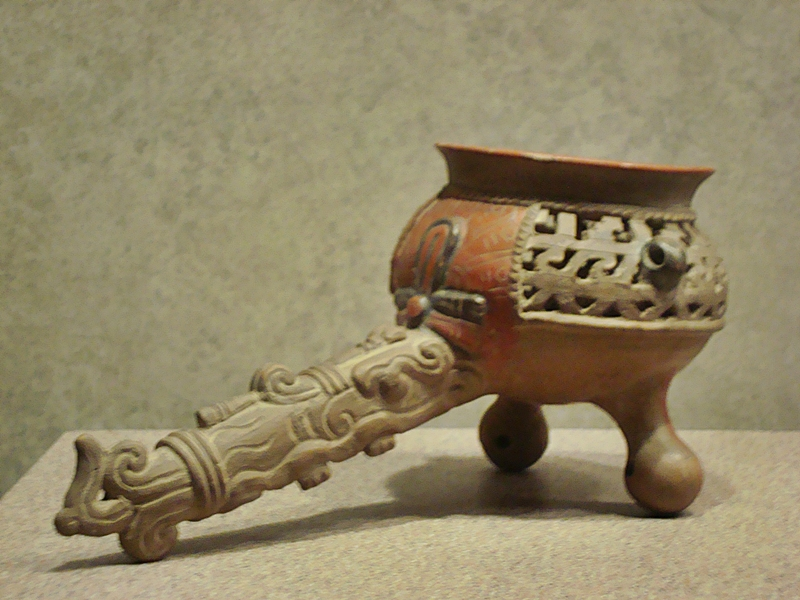
Religion was an important sphere in the life of the Mixtecs in pre-Hispanic times. One of the attributes of the yaha yahui was the sahumador, whose representations appear frequently in the codex. In the image, a Mixtec ceramic sahumador. It comes from the Highland Mixteca, Postclassic period, MNA collection.

The Mixtecs of pre-Hispanic times had an animist religion. According to the information that has been obtained from the pictographic documents produced by this people, from colonial historical sources and from the analysis of archaeological evidence, it can be said that it shares with other Mesoamerican religions some very characteristic features, among them, the belief in a primordial dual principle that gave origin to the world as it is known, and the belief that the world has been created and destroyed on several occasions. According to the Codex Vindobonensis, One Deer-Serpent Jaguar and One Deer-Serpent Puma created the first beings of the world, the ñuhu (IPA: [ɲuʔu]), who helped to order it. All the beings of the first creation were petrified when the Sun — revered in the Mixtec with the names of Yya Ndicahndíí and Taandoco — rose above the firmament, although some of them took refuge in the caves and did not perish. The ñuhu embodied the very elements of nature: fire, wind, water, earth, vegetation, fauna. As it was believed that some of them took refuge in the caves to avoid being petrified, one of the distinctive elements of the Mixtec religion was the worship of the mountains and in the caves. Some of them were — and are — destination of pious pilgrimages of the Mixtecs, among the most conspicuous of these subway galleries are the caves of Chalcatongo in Highland Mixteca, where the sanctuary of Nine Grass, the goddess of death of the Mixtecs, was located.

The tutelary god of the Mixtecs was Dzahui (literally Rain), divinity of rain and celestial water. The cult of rain was so important for the Mixtecs that their native name qualifies them as the people of rain, that is, the people chosen by Dzahui. He shares many attributes with the Tlaloc of central Mesoamerica, venerated by the Teotihuacan, Toltec, and Mexica and who appears on numerous effigy vessels found especially in Highland Mixteca. The cult of Dzahui in the Mixtec is very ancient, its appearance dates back to the end of the Late Preclassic, that is, between the 5th century BC and 2nd century AD.

On the other hand, in the Lowland Mixteca, the ñuiñe society was characterized by the cult of the old god of fire, Huehuetéotl, venerated since ancient times throughout Mesoamerica. It has been speculated that the cult of Huehuetéotl may have been one of the first to take shape in Mesoamerica, since its representations have been found in populations as old as Cuicuilco to the great Postclassic cities such as Tenochtitlan itself. The cult of fire in Lowland Mixteca is also reflected in the toponymy of the region: Ñuiñe, which is the Mixtec toponym of the area, and which means "Hot Land". The Ñuiñe representations of the divinity of fire share with other Mesoamerican representations of the same divinity several attributes. It is represented as an old man in a seated position, carrying a large brasero on his head. In some effigies obtained in Cerro de las Minas, the Mixtec god of fire appears holding in his hands sahumadores or special vessels to light tobacco. In the Lowland Mixteca, the fire cult coexisted with the rain cult during the flourishing period of the Ñuiñe style (3rd-7th centuries A.D.); the decline of this society also implied the decline of the fire cult in the Lowland Mixteca, as indicated by the lower number of representations of this divinity in the region.

Human sacrifice among the Mixtecs was a ritual practice of considerable antiquity. In the archaeological zone of Huamelulpan the remains of some skulls have been found that must have been part of a tzompantli. The most important rituals in the life of the pre-Hispanic societies of the Mixtec included sacrifices of animals or human beings, as shown by several important events in the chronicles of the pre-Columbian past of the Mixtecs. A particular case is the sacrifice of the descendants of the lords of Bulto de Xipe and Jaltepec, sacrificed by order of Eight Deer through gladiatorial sacrifice and ritual arrowing. Both forms of human sacrifice were related to the cult of Xipe Tótec, the god of fertility and patron of the reigning lineage in Lugar del Bulto de Xipe.

Like the rest of Mixtec society, the religious also maintained a fairly stable hierarchical structure. The high priests of the cult of a divinity were called yaha yahui (Eagle-Serpent of Fire). According to the beliefs of the Mixtecs, the yaha yahui possessed the ability to transmute into animals (nahualism) and were feared for the power they possessed over the supernatural world.

Among the most important Mixtec religious centers on the eve of the Spanish conquest were San Miguel Achiutla, Chalcatongo, Tilantongo, Yanhuitlán, Yucuita, Apoala and Sosola.

=== Arts ===
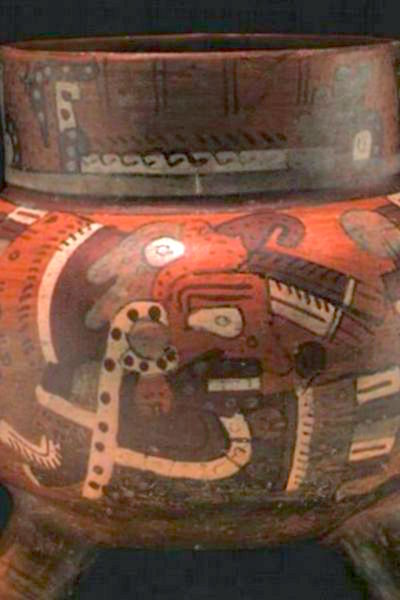
Polychrome vessel of codex style. Mixtec culture, from Xayacatlán (Puebla), Late Postclassic period (XII-XVI centuries A.D.), part of the collection of the National Museum of Anthropology (Mexico)

Pre-Hispanic Mixtec art is widely related to religion and worship, some of the most sumptuous pieces were destined for temple altars or ritual uses. However, there are also other objects that were used by the political and religious elite and were intended for everyday enjoyment. Most of the Mixtec artistic pieces that are known today correspond to the Postclassic Period (10th-16th centuries), which is also the period of greatest apogee in La Mixteca and most of it. The Mixtec society favored the development of the minor arts, reaching a remarkable preciosity in the framework of the severity of Mesoamerican art. The weak development of architecture and stone sculpture, particularly when comparing the Mixtecs with neighboring populations such as the Zapotecs, led Barbro Dahlgren to believe that Mixtec artists were simply collecting the artistic traditions of previous cultures.

Mixtec architecture is relatively simple, according to what is known from excavations. In the archaeological sites of the area, vestiges of ancient constructions that never reached great importance have been found. From the pre-Columbian codex of this town it is known that the temples were located on pyramidal platforms that had access stairways. The civil buildings were organized around large plazas and the interior rooms were organized around courtyards. In the case of the dwellings for the lower strata of society, the prevailing materials were not very resistant, including bahareque for the walls and palm for the roofs.

Many of the known Mixtec pieces are ceramic pieces, whose durable material has withstood the passage of time. Some of the oldest correspond to the Middle Preclassic. They are pieces that reflect the influence of Olmec and Zapotec styles, as in the case of the pottery found in Monte Negro. The ñuiñe style, which developed in Lowland Mixteca during the Classic, also shows a strong Zapotec influence, combined with some elements of Teotihuacan inspiration. In that area and during that period, the representations of the god of fire were very popular. Other characteristic pieces of the ñuiñe style are the colossal heads that have been found in Acatlán, Anicano, and other localities of La Mixteca Poblana. In some localities of La Montaña, pieces of the ñuiñe style are preserved and are still worshipped by the Nahua, Tlapaneco and Mixtec people that inhabit this region.

The stage of greatest flourishing of pre-Hispanic Mixtec pottery was the Postclassic Period. During this period, an iconographic style that is heir to earlier Mesoamerican traditions from Teotihuacan, the Zapotec region, and the Maya area spread in La Mixteca. Originally it was thought that this style was typical of the region that includes Cholula, Tlaxcala and La Mixteca, so it was called Mixteca-Puebla. However, as other regions of Mesoamerica were explored, it was realized that the local Mixtec style is part of a pan-Mesoamerican iconographic style. Postclassic Mixtec pottery has a very fine finish and a great decorative richness. The thickness of the clay with which these pieces were made is very thin, its color is generally reddish or brown with a high quality burnishing that produces a glazed effect on the pieces. The surface of these was decorated with great profusion, with themes and colors similar to those found in the Mixtec codex. Mixtec polychrome pottery was intended for use by the elite. Some pieces of this type of pottery have been found outside the Mixtec region.

There are ancient samples of sculpture in the Mixtec region. Stelae have been found in several localities, for example in Yucuita and Yucuñudahui, which show the same Teotihuacan and Zapotec cultural influence that reached the ceramics during the Preclassic and Classic periods. The stelae of Yucuita were little worked, practically they consist of big stones with surfaces and forms little worked where dates and calendrical names of important personages were inscribed. In some sites of ñuiñe tradition such as Cerro de las Minas and Huajuapan, lintels have been found that adorned the entrances of some buildings. However, the best Mixtec sculptures are small pieces carved with the same virtuosity and profusion as the ceramic finishes. The Mixtecs produced small sumptuary objects of bone, wood, rock crystal, and semi-precious stones such as jade and turquoise, of such exquisiteness that Alfonso Caso compared them to the "best Chinese carvings". Many of these objects have been found in funerary contexts, as in the case of Tomb 7 of Monte Alban, which gave the world a remarkable sample of the artistic refinement of the Mixtec society.

=== Clothing ===
==== The Mixtec woman ====
The dress for the Mixtec woman includes: blanket blouse which is embroidered around the neck and sleeves also the skirt of holán al aire, made of poplin with printed flowers and adorned with three colored ribbons, symbolizing the three Mixtecs on the left side, shines a bundle of seven ribbons of bright colors. Underneath it she wears a blanket sash. A black shawl is used as a girdle, symbolizing marital status and maternity. The scarf, which the woman wears around her neck, is used to wipe the sweat that emanates from her face due to the effort made, for being an industrious woman. She wears papelillo necklaces of different shades. In her hairstyle, she wears her hair in braids, which she decorates with four colored ribbons, and she puts a red carnation in her hair. To protect her delicate feet, she wears huaraches with two white straps.

==== The Mixtec man ====
The man wears breeches and a blanket shirt, and at the waist he wears a paliacate and another at the neck; on the shoulder, he carries a wool coton, and wears a palm hat, in the style of four stones, with a wide brim, and also wears huaraches with three white straps.

=== Metallurgy ===
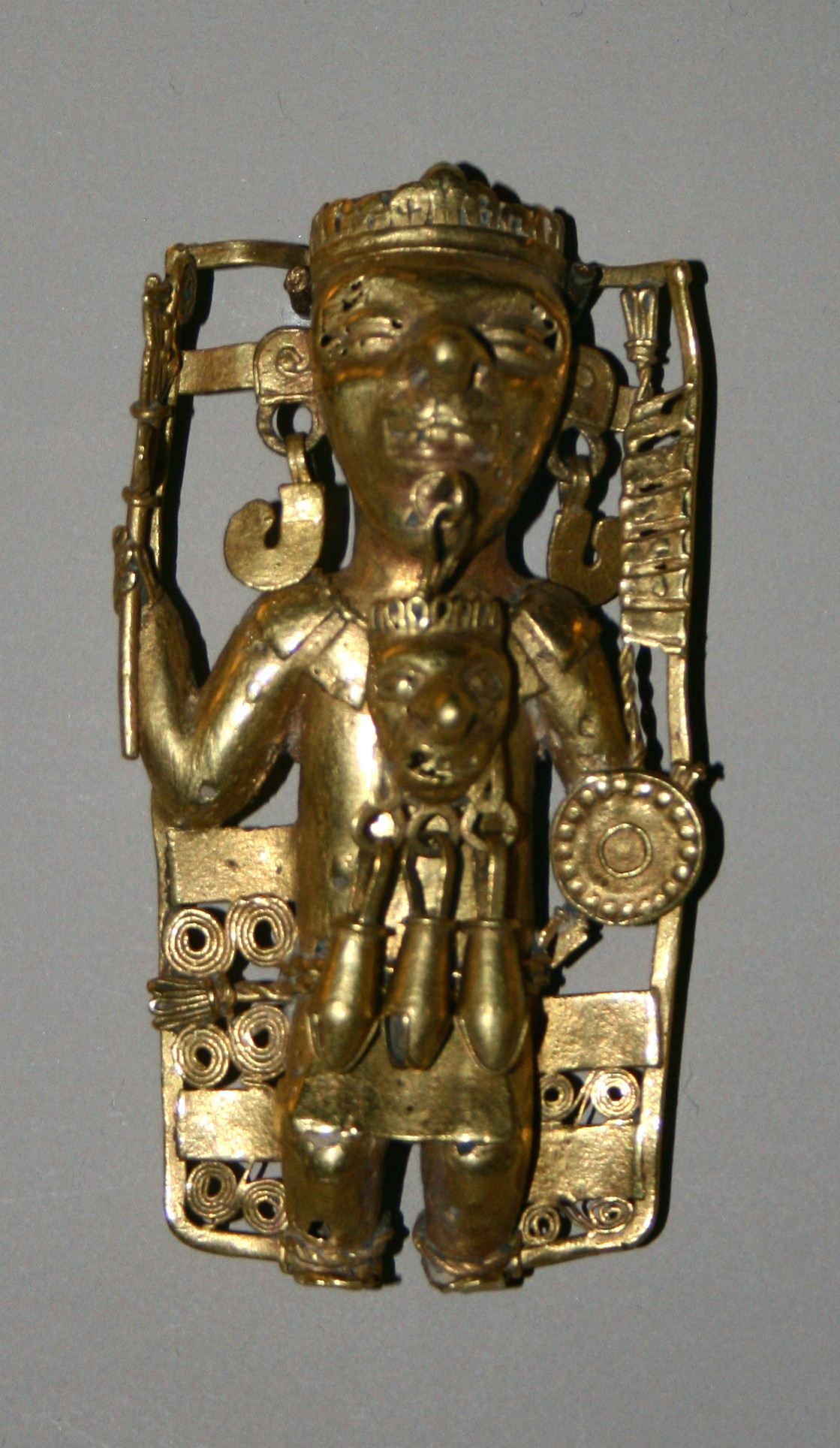
Pectoral with a representation of a Mixtec lord. It is part of the collection of the British Museum (London)

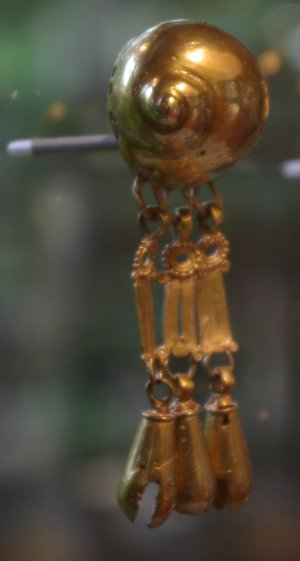
Gold earring in the shape of a snail, currently part of the collection of the Dumbarton Oaks Museum (Washington)

Metallurgy was an activity that developed late in Mesoamerica. Christian Duverger argues that this is the result of a cultural choice of the populations of the region, who turned Mesoamerica into a "stone civilization". The earliest evidence of metallurgy in Mesoamerica dates from the end of the Classic period and comes from western Mesoamerica. It is known that this technology was imported from Central and South America, where it was developed much earlier than in Mesoamerica. By the time of the Conquest, the Tarascans of Michoacán worked copper and other metals with great skill, with which they made tools for daily use and sumptuary objects.

In the Oaxacan area, the Mixtecs also adopted metallurgy during the Postclassic period. Copper axes have been found in the area, showing that metallurgy in pre-Hispanic Oaxaca was not only for ornamental purposes. The best known pieces of Mixtec goldsmithing are the gold pieces. Gold was considered by the Mesoamericans as excrement of the gods and during the Postclassic period it became a sign of the Sun. For this reason, some of the most exquisite pieces of Mixtec gold work combine gold with turquoise, the solar stone par excellence in Mesoamerican culture. This is the case of the Shield of Yanhuitlán, one of the best known pieces of Mixtec goldsmithing.

The gold pieces in the Mixtec culture were part of the set of objects whose use was reserved for the rulers. The clothing of the Postclassic rulers incorporated numerous gold elements, which were combined with a wide variety of objects made of jade, turquoise, feathers, and fine textiles. Upon the arrival of the Spaniards, many pieces of gold from La Mixteca were melted down to form ingots. Some of them were sent to Europe and escaped destruction. Archaeological excavations have allowed the recovery of an important number of pieces in archaeological sites throughout La Mixteca. The findings of Zaachila and Tomb 7 of Monte Alban are remarkable. In the latter site, the largest number of gold and silver pieces found in Mesoamerica in a single site was found.

== See also ==
- Mixtec
- Mixtec monarchs
- Mixtec languages
- Mixtec writing
- Mixtec Group
- Eight Deer Jaguar Claw
- Mesoamerica

== Bibliography ==
- Alvear Acevedo, Carlos (2004). Historia de México. Mexico City: Noriega. ISBN 978-968-18-6146-9.
- Balkansky, Andrew K. (1998). "Urbanism and Early State Formation in the Huamelulpan Valley of Southern Mexico". Latin American Antiquity. 9 (1): 37–67. doi:10.2307/972127. JSTOR 972127. S2CID 163558379.
- Balkansky, Andrew K.; Kowalewski, Stephen A.; Pérez Rodríguez, Verónica; Pluckhahn, Thomas J.; Smith, Charlotte A.; Stiver, Laura R.; Beliaev, Dmitri; Chamblee, John F.; Heredia Espinoza, Verenice Y.; and Santos Pérez, Roberto (2000). «Archaeological Survey in the Mixteca Alta of Oaxaca, Mexico». Journal of Field Archaeology 4(20): pp. 365–389.
- Caso, Alfonso (1977). Reyes y reinos de la Mixteca. Tomo I. Mexico City: FCE. ISBN 9681617878.
- -------- (1979). Reyes y reinos de la Mixteca. Diccionario biográfico de los señores mixtecos. Mexico City: FCE. ISBN 968-16-1788-6.
- -------- (1992)[1942]. "La Tumba 7 de Monte Albán", en Actualidades Arqueológicas, 4.
- Christensen, Alexander F. (1998). "Colonization and Microevolution in Formative Oaxaca, Mexico" (PDF). World Archaeology. 30 (2): 262–285. doi:10.1080/00438243.1998.9980410. JSTOR 124986.
- Dahlgren de Jordán, Barbro (1990). La Mixteca, su cultura e historia prehispánicas. Mexico City: Universidad Nacional Autónoma de México.
- De los Reyes, Antonio (1962). Arte en lengua mixteca. Edición facsimilar de Wigberto Jiménez Moreno. Mexico City: Instituto Nacional de Antropología e Historia.
- DUVERGER, Christian (2007). El primer mestizaje. La clave para entender el pasado mesoamericano. Mexico City: Taurus. ISBN 978-970-770-856-3.
- Flannery, Kent V. and Marcus, Joyce (2007). «Las sociedades jerárquicas oaxaqueñas y el intercambio con los olmecas». Arqueología Mexicana, (87): 71-76.
- Gaxiola González, Margarita (2007). «Huamelulpan, Oaxaca». Arqueología Mexicana, (90): 34-35.
- Graulich, Michel (2003). «El sacrificio humano en Mesoamérica». Arqueología Mexicana, (63): 16-21.
- González Leyva, Alejandra (2009). «Geografía, lingüística, arqueología e historia de la Mixteca alta antes de la conquista española». Anuario de Historia. Volume 1. 2007: 45-66.
- Hermann Lejarazu, Manuel (2007). Códice Nuttal: lado 1. La vida de Ocho Venado. Edición especial de Arqueología Mexicana (23). Mexico City: Raíces-INAH.
- Hosler, Dorothy (1997), «Los orígenes andinos de la metalurgia del occidente de México» on the website Biblioteca Luis Ángel Arango of Banco de la República de Colombia.
- LÓPEZ AUSTIN, Alfredo y Leonardo LÓPEZ LUJÁN (1999). Mito y realidad de Zuyuá. Mexico City: FCE. ISBN 968-16-5889-2.
- ---------- (2001). El pasado indígena. Mexico City: FCE. ISBN 968-16-4890-0.
- Jansen, Maarten (1992). «Mixtec Pictography: Contents and Conventions». At Reifler Bricker, Victoria (ed.): Epigraphy. Supplement to the Handbook of Middle-American Indians, 20-33. Austin: University of Texas Press. ISBN 0-292-77556-3.
- ------- (1999). «Los fundamentos para una 'lectura lírica' de los códices». Estudios de Cultura Náhuatl, (30): 165-181.
- Jansen, Maarten and Pérez Jiménez, Gabina Aurora (2002). «Amanecer en Ñuu Dzavui». Arqueología mexicana, (56): 42-47.
- ------- (2009). La lengua señorial de Ñuu Dzaui. Cultura literaria de los antiguos y reinos y transformación colonial. Oaxaca de Juárez: Colegio Superior para la Educación Integral Intercultural de Oaxaca.
- Josserand, J. Kathryn; Jansen, Maarten and Romero Frizzi, Ángeles (1984). «Mixtec dialectology: inferences from Linguistics and Ethnohistory». At Josserand, J. K.; Winter, Marcus; and Hopkins, Nicholas A. (eds.), Essays in Otomanguean Culture and History, 119-230. Nashville: Vanderbilt University Publications in Anthropology.
- Joyce, Arthur A. and Levine, Marc N. (2007). «Tututepec (Yuca Dzaa). Un imperio del Posclásico en la Mixteca de la Costa». Arqueología Mexicana, (90): 44-47.
- Joyce, Arthur A. and Winter, Marcus (1996). «Ideology, Power, and Urban Society in Pre-Hispanic Oaxaca». Current Anthropology, 1(37): 33-47.
- Justeson, John S. (1986). "The Origin of Writing Systems: Preclassic Mesoamerica". World Archaeology. 17 (3): 437–458. doi:10.1080/00438243.1986.9979981. JSTOR 124706.
- Lind, Michael (2008). «Arqueología de la Mixteca». Desacatos, (27): 13-32.
- Maldonado, Blanca E. (2005). «Metalurgia tarasca del cobre en el sitio de Itziparátzico, Michoacán, México» on the website FAMSI.
- Marcus, Joyce (2001). «Breaking the glass ceiling: the strategies of royal women in ancient states». At Klein Cecilia F. (ed.), Gender in Pre-Hispanic America. Dumbarton Oaks Research Library and Collection.
- Matos Moctezuma, Eduardo (2002). «Huehuetéotl-Xiuhtecuhtli en el Centro de México». Arqueología Mexicana, (56): 58:63.
- Moser, Chris L. (1969). «Matching Polychrome Sets from Acatlan, Puebla». American Antiquity, 34(4): 480-483.
- Oudijk, Michel R. (2007). «Mixtecos y zapotecos en la época prehispánica». Arqueología Mexicana, (90): 58-62.
- Paddock, John (1976). «Arqueología de la Mixteca». At Piña Chan, Román (ed.), Los señoríos y Estados militaristas: 299-325. Mexico City: Instituto Nacional de Antropología e Historia.
- -------- (1990). «Concepción de la idea Ñuiñe». En Oaxaqueños de antes. Oaxaca de Juárez: Oaxaca Antiguo A.C. y Casa de la Cultura Oaxaqueña.
- Pohl, John (s. f.). «Libros antiguos: códices del grupo mixteco». At Mesoamérica.
- Rivera Guzmán, Ángel Iván (1998). «La iconografía del poder en los grabados del Cerro de La Caja, Mixteca Baja de Oaxaca». At Barba de Piña Chan, Beatriz (ed.), Iconografía mexicana. Mexico City: Plaza y Valdés-INAH.
- -------- (1999). El patrón de asentamiento en la Mixteca Baja de Oaxaca: análisis del área de Tequixtepec-Chazumba, Escuela Nacional de Antropología e Historia, México. Premio Alfonso Caso a la mejor tesis de licenciatura en arqueología.
- Rossell, Cecilia and Ojeda Díaz, María de los Ángeles (2003). Mujeres y sus diosas en los códices preshispánicos de Oaxaca. Mexico City: CIESAS-Miguel Ángel Porrúa. ISBN 970-701-393-1.
- Villela Flores, Samuel (2006a). «Los estudios etnológicos en Guerrero». Diario de Campo (38): 29-44.
- -------- (2006b). «Ídolos en los altares. La religiosidad indígena en la Montaña de Guerrero». Arqueología Mexicana (82): 62-67.
- Spores, Ronald (1967). The Mixtec Kings and Their People. Norman: University of Oklahoma Press.
- ------- (1969). «Settlement, farming technology, and environment in the Nochixtlan Valley». Science, New Series, 166(3905): 557-569.
- ------- (2007). «La Mixteca y los mixtecos. 3000 años de adaptación cultural». Arqueología Mexicana, (90): 28-33.
- Terraciano, Kevin (2001). The Mixtecs of colonial Oaxaca: Nudzahui history, sixteenth through eighteenth centuries. Stanfornd: Universidad de Stanford. ISBN 0-8047-5104-8.
- Urcid, Javier (2004). Paisajes sagrados y memoria social: las inscripciones ñuiñe en el Puente Colosal, Tepelmeme, Oaxaca. Reporte de investigación para FAMSI.
- Winter, Marcus (2008). «Cerro de las Minas, Oaxaca». Arqueología Mexicana (90): 37-39.
