= Yuculta =

Yuculta is from the Kwak'wala language of northern Vancouver Island and may refer to:

- Yucultas, a Southern Kwakiutl First Nations people of Campbell River and Quadra Island
- Yuculta Rapids, in the Cordero Channel near the mouth of Bute Inlet

== See also ==
- Yucuita
- Yukulta
