= Dzahui =

Mythical deity in Mixtec folklore

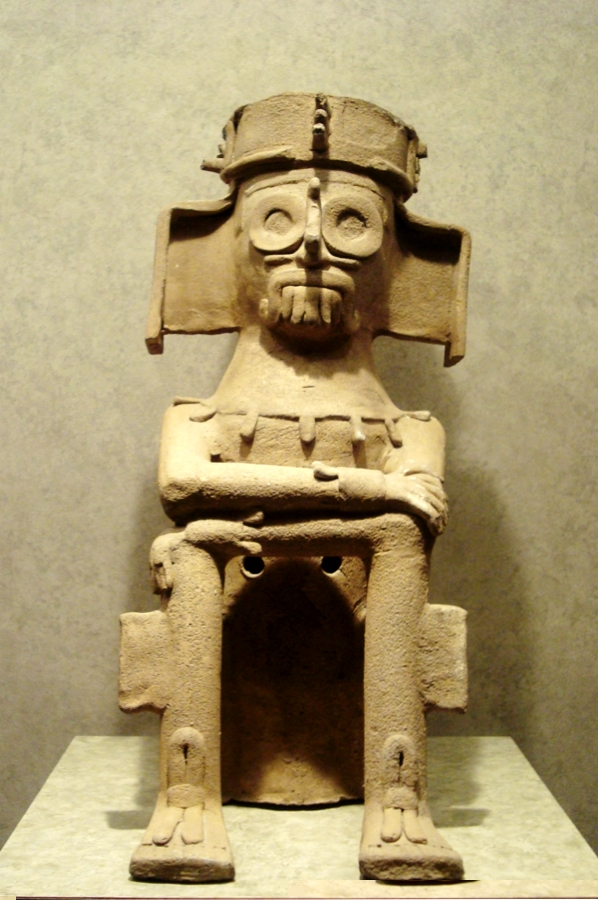
Dzahui, Mixtec god of rain.

In Mixtec mythology, Dzahui (also spelled Dzavui) is the god of rain, for whom child sacrifices were performed on hilltops during times of drought, disease, and harvest.

In Mixtec codices, Dzahui exhibits the blue or green rain goggle mask also seen on the central Mexican deity Tlaloc. He possesses exposed teeth incisors and longer, somewhat curled jaguar canine teeth emerging from curled lips. Occasionally, depictions of Dzahui depict the god with a blue or green protrusion, emerging from his nose.

== See also ==
- Chaac — Maya rain god
- Cocijo — Zapotec rain god
- Tlaloc — Aztec rain god
- Achiutla — Spiritual and cultural Mixtec city
