= Yahui =

Mesoamerican supernatural figure

Yahui is a supernatural figure that takes on various mixtures of animal and human forms within the culture and belief systems of the Mixtec—indigenous Mixtecan-speaking people of La Mixteca in central-southeastern Mexico. It is an important and recurring motif in Mixtec iconography, thought and culture, especially during the pre-Columbian era. As a supernatural figure, the yahui appears in Postclassic Mixtec codices as an entity wearing a serpent or reptilian tail and headdress (similar to the xiuhcoatl motif) and the carapace of a turtle.

Depictions of yahui-figures appear in several Mixtec codices, including the Codex Zouche-Nuttall, Codex Vindobonensis Mexicanus I, Codex Selden, Codex Bodley, Codex Egerton, and Codex Becker I/II.

The yahui appears in two main forms: the nahual, or man-animal composite figure, and the animal figure. In the animal form, a reptilian head is combined with a tortoise shell body, reptilian arms and legs, claws and the flint-fire motif on the tips of the tail and nose. The animal yahui appears in cosmogony scenes illustrating the origins of ritual and cultural phenomena.

In the nahual form, the yahui animal imagery is combined with a male, human head. In some depictions, the nahual possesses reptilian claws, while other depictions portray the figure with human hands. At times, the nahual figures holds sacrificial knives and perform sacrificial rites or other ceremonial activities.

A third form of yahui depiction incorporates the flint-flame motif into personal name symbolism of specific figures in the Mixtec codices. This third form has been referred to as the "glyphic" form for its significance as a phonetic signifier in personal names. One can view the glyphic usage of the flint-flame motif on page 28 of the Codex Bodley. The artist depicted Lord 4 Wind's mummy bundle, only his crocodile helmet and flint-flame nose poking out to aid in identification of his personage to viewers.

The yahui appears in a few other works of art from the pre-Columbian era. One of these depictions is viewable by the public in one of the Zapotec tombs in Zaachila.

As a real, historical figure, the yahui probably performed cosmological rites in caves and on hilltops. In his Politics of Symbolism in the Mixtec Codices (1994: 42-47), John Pohl explored the role of the yahui as a member of a group of ruling figures.

== Scholarship on the Yahui ==
Mary Elizabeth Smith identified the yahui as the "xiuhcoatl-turtle-sacrificer" when she analyzed the Codex Muro and colonial Mexican documents. She identified the flint-flame tail motif and turtle carapace as the key symbols that distinguish the yahui from other specific figures in the Mixtec codices. She suggested that the meaning of those motifs extended beyond aesthetic, cosmological, and historical symbolism and into the realm of linguistics.

Pohl dedicated an entire chapter of his Symbolism in the Mixtec Codices (1994) to a discussion of the yahui. Most recently, Pohl has suggested that one testimony provided during the mid-sixteenth century Inquisition proceedings in Yanhuitlan may be from a practicing yahui priest.

Maarten Jansen contributed a major advancement in scholarship on the yahui when he suggested in La dinastia de Anute: historia, literatura e ideologia de un reino mixteco (2000) that the yahui is incorporated into the creation story of Cuilapan recorded by fray Gregorio Garcia. Through a linguistic comparison of the original Spanish story to a theoretical reconstruction of the pre-Columbian Mixteco version, Jansen realized that the codex from which fray Gregorio Garcia worked probably referenced the yahui. If one follows Jansen's conclusion, one would conclude that a yahui was one of two siblings descended from the Mixtec primordial gods, the creator-couple sharing the same calendrical day-name One Deer.
