= Yucuita =

Coordinates: 17°30′N 97°16′W

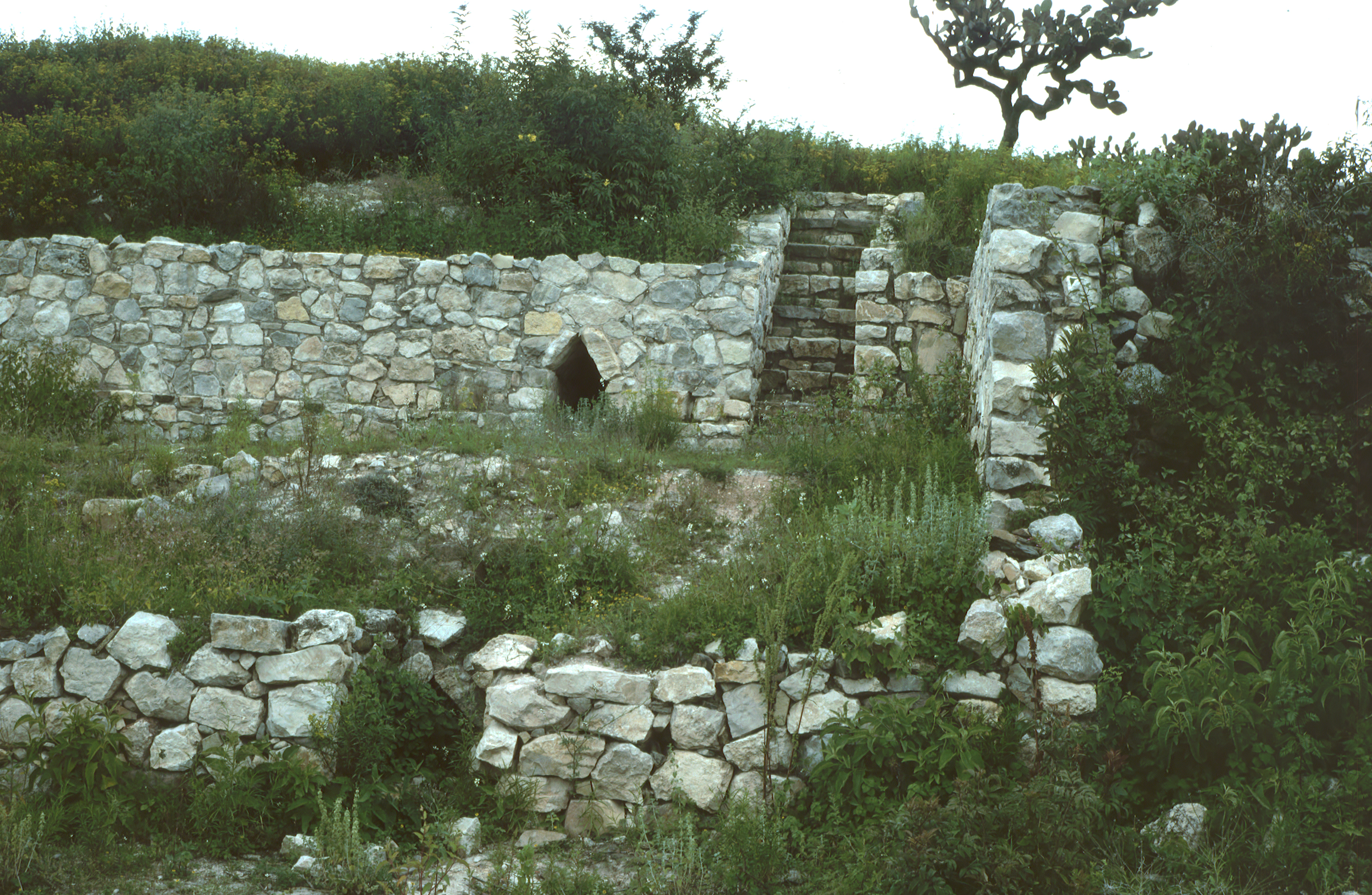
Yucuita

Yucuita (Mixtec: Yúku'ita, meaning Hill-flower, or Hill of Flowers) is an archaeological site located in the Mixtec municipality of San Juan Yucuita in the Mexican state of Oaxaca. It was founded by the Mixtec civilization in the pre-Classic Period as a small village dedicated to agriculture and obsidian.

Because of its antiquity and its long-term continuous occupation (from the fourteenth century BCE to the ninth century CE), Yucuita is one of the most studied Mixtec archaeological sites.

== Description ==
Located in a small plain of Oaxaca's Sierra Mixteca, Yucuita is some 86 km (53 mi) northeast of the city of Oaxaca, the capital of the state.

Although the precolumbian Mixtecs were not characterized by monumental architecture, in Yucuita there are two architectonic complexes that have been the object of numerous investigations since the 1930s, when Esteban Avendaño explored the zone (1933). The most recent excavations at the site were in 1976-80 by the National Institute of Anthropology and History (INAH).

One of these complexes was dedicated to the living quarters of the governing elite. It consists of a platform constructed on the slope of a hill. The platform supports the remains of living quarters set around a central patio. The second complex was a ceremonial center, of which only part of the platform and two long walls remain. One wall is 70 m long by 4 m high (230 ft by 13 ft). At right angles to it is another wall, 52 m (171 ft) long. On the northern side of the first wall is a narrow stairway leading to the top of the platform. Near the stairway is a narrow tunnel roughly 60 m (200 ft) in length, which served for drainage and as a passageway.

== See also ==
- List of oldest buildings in the Americas
- Etlatongo
- Yucuñudahui
