= Monte Negro, Oaxaca =

Monte Negro
- Municipality and town
- Location in Mexico
- Coordinates: 17°35′N 95°53′W
- Country: Mexico
- State: Oaxaca

Area
  - Total: 547.33 km^{2} (211.33 sq mi)
- Elevation: 100 m (330 ft)

Population
  - Total: 1,876
- Time zone: UTC-6 (Central Standard Time)
  - Summer (DST): UTC-5 (Central Daylight Time)
- Postal code: 68920
- Area code: 954

Monte Negro is a mountain top site that at existed around 200 BC and at one time consisted of an average of 2,900 people. Its use was short lived due to a lack of rural sites (only terracing throughout the mountain). Some of the architecture of Monte Negro is very distinct using columns and structures no higher than six meters. The site is rich with ceramics and designs imported from the nearby Monte Alban.

== Architecture ==
The buildings excavated at Monte Negro consist mostly of rectangular platforms arranged around small patios. One set of buildings is aligned along streets over 100 meters long. The streets ran east–west, and another set running north–south giving the site an L shape. The largest plaza in Monte Negro is 20 m x 20 m and is surrounded with a temple and other buildings. These substructures are made of limestone blocks and rubble with column bases.

Walls had stone foundations with adobe blocks. Columns along the structural bases supported thatched roofs. The columns are the most distinguishing part of the architecture of the site. The columns are made of stacked uneven cut stones arranged in a column in order to fill the column with rubble. The columns were about 3 m in height and were associated with both elite residences and temples. To access the adobe structures at the top of the platforms, stone stairways were used.

Structures became more private and standardized. Household structures and their physical closeness to temples suggest the start of conjoined civic religious complexes seen later at Monte Alban. Elite housing was identifiable with more stone carvings and proximity to temples and plazas. Monte Negro temples vary in size and designs internally, but each is set on top of stone platforms with column supports and stairways. They have certain similarities to structures at Monte Alban.

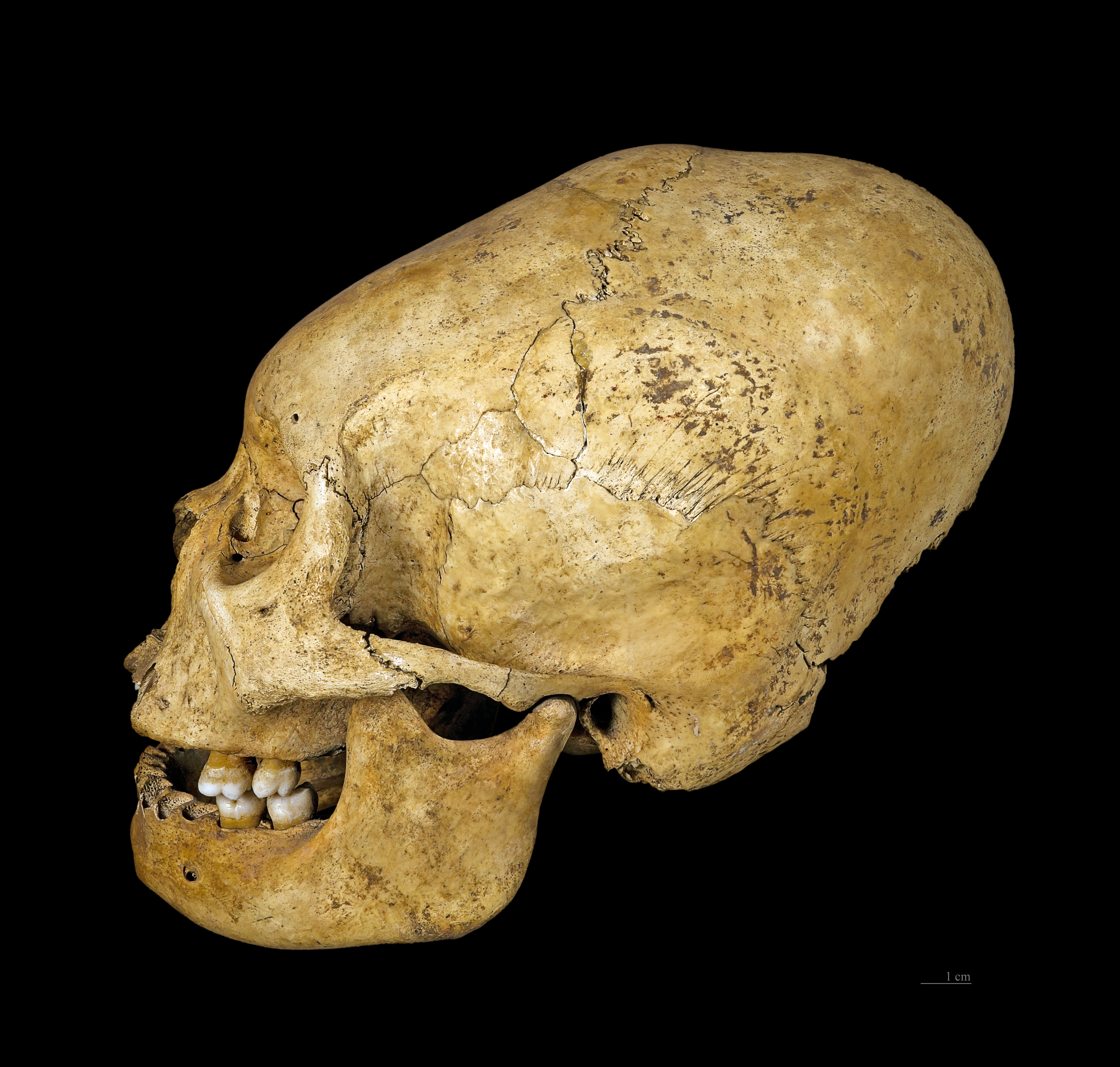
Example of a Deformed Skull

Excavated tombs suggest the presence of elite members of society. Some of these elite members were buried in temple platforms with numerous ceramic offerings, spondyllus shell and jade ear ornaments. Skull deformations are seen in certain burials, which is a sign of elite membership. Some tombs were made of adobe blocks with stone or wood beams for roofing; other burials were simple pits.

== Agriculture ==
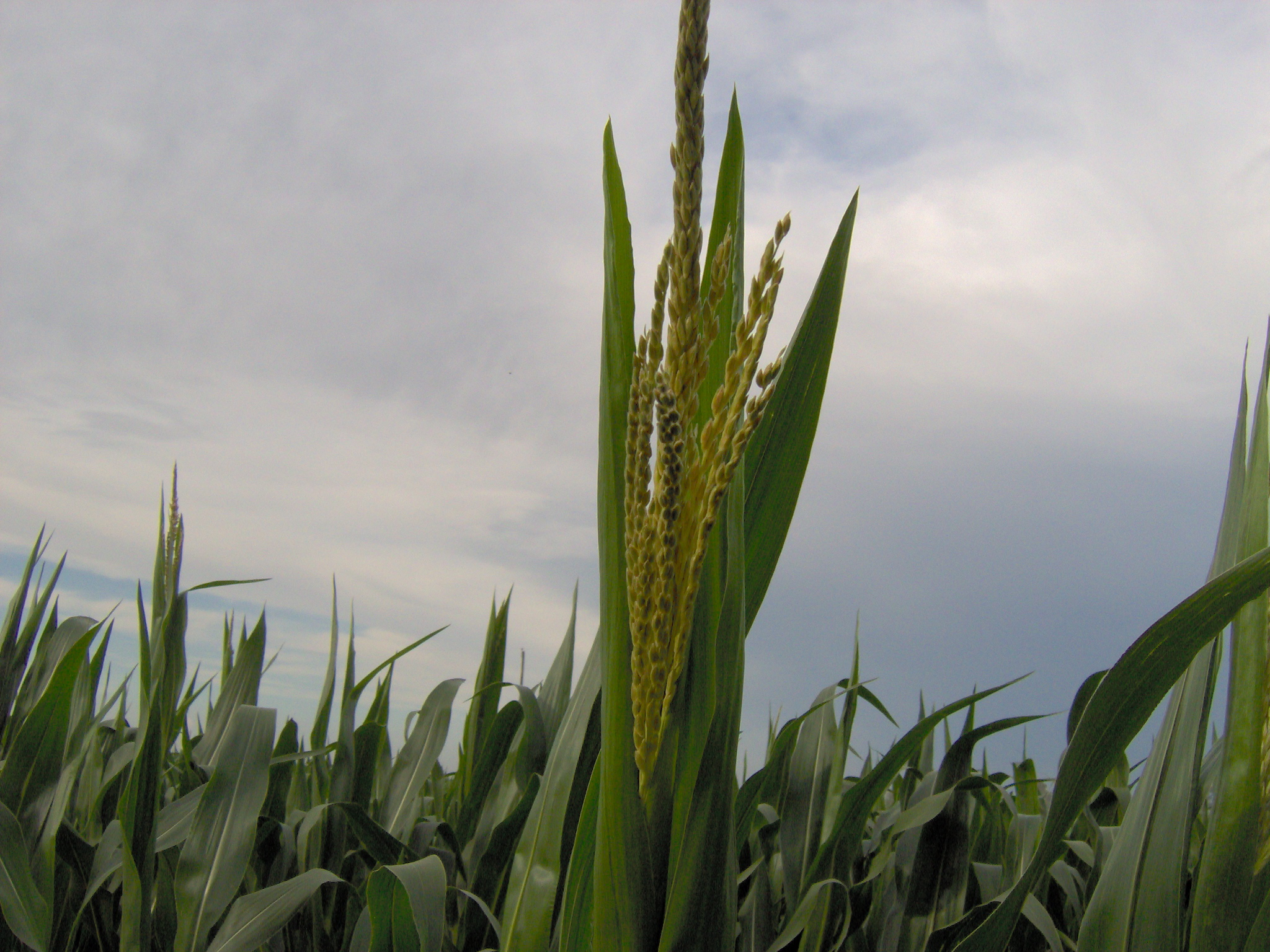
Maize

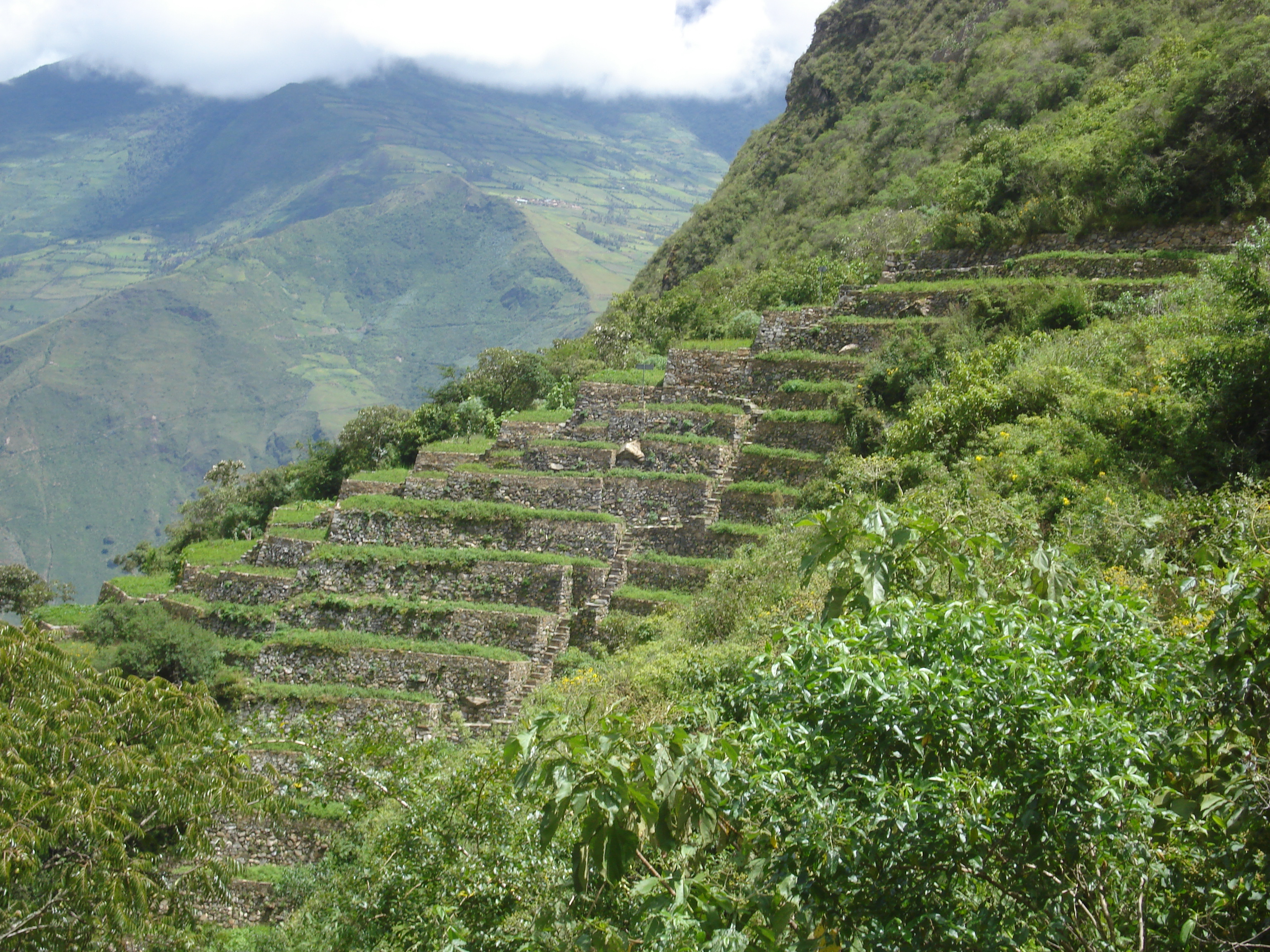
Example of Terraces

Monte Negro used a terracing system called lama-bordo. This farming technology is similar to cross-channel terraces as a labor-intensive system that supported a strong centralized authority. The terrace walls are made of stone and rebuilt over time. The process of rebuilding left redeposit soil several meters deep good for crops. The terrace systems go along down the mountainside and down into the valley floor 500 m down. The main crop being grown on these terraces was predominately maize. The height of the terraces restricted growing season due to frost.

== Ceramics ==
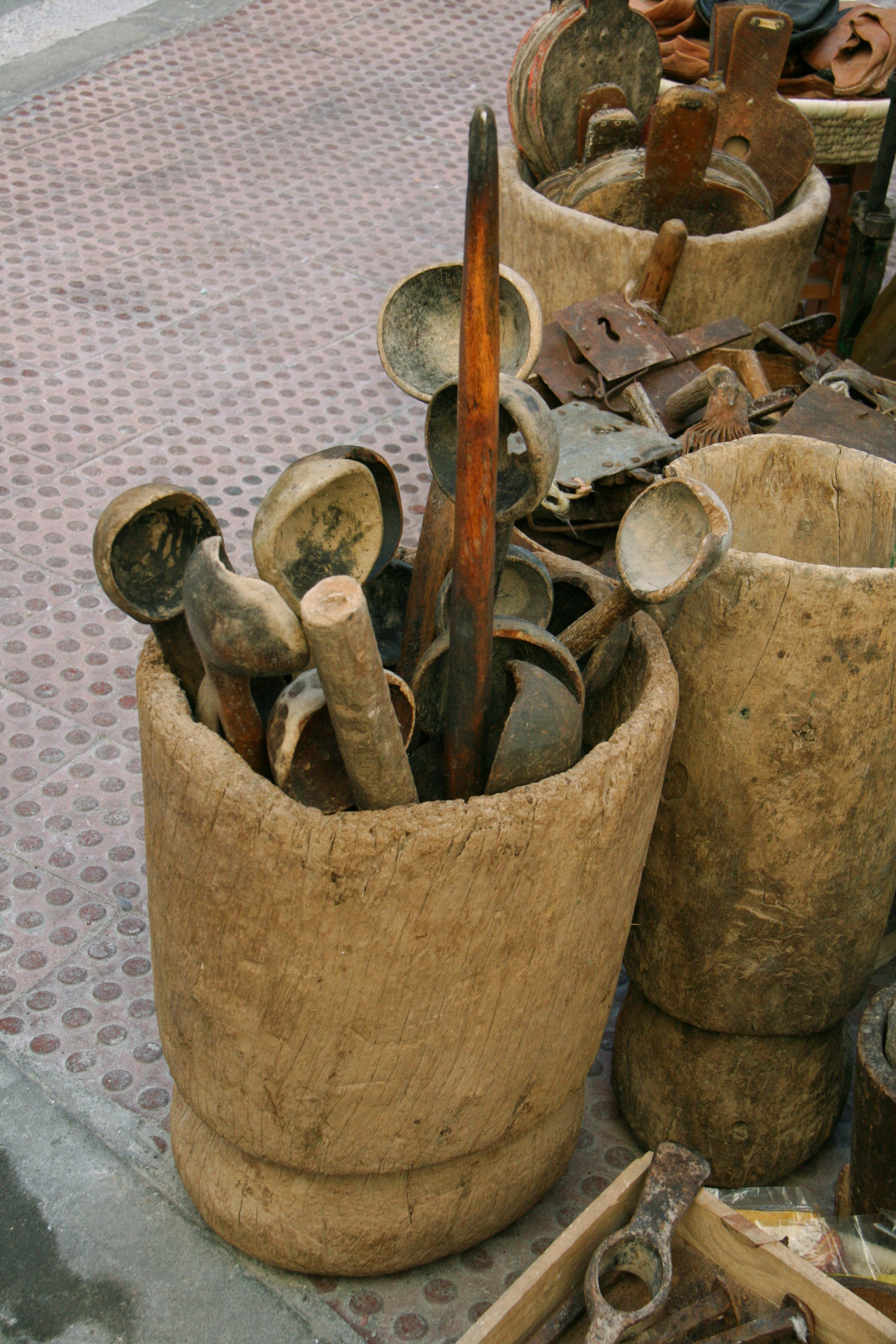
Cucharas or spoons

Monte Negro has ceramics similar, based on clay composition, to Monte Alban. Recent radiocarbon dates suggest that Monte Negro could have predated Monte Alban.

Tanware including jars, cucharas (spoons), comales (tortilla griddles), and bowls were found with red, and black-on-red paintings. Grayware also decorated with red and black paintings were found and are most likely imported from Oaxaca.

Post-classic ceramics were also found throughout the terraces. These ceramics included “creamware” bowls and jars. The creamware has a distinct yellow to yellow-orange color.
