= Sierra Mixteca =

Mountainous region of Mexico

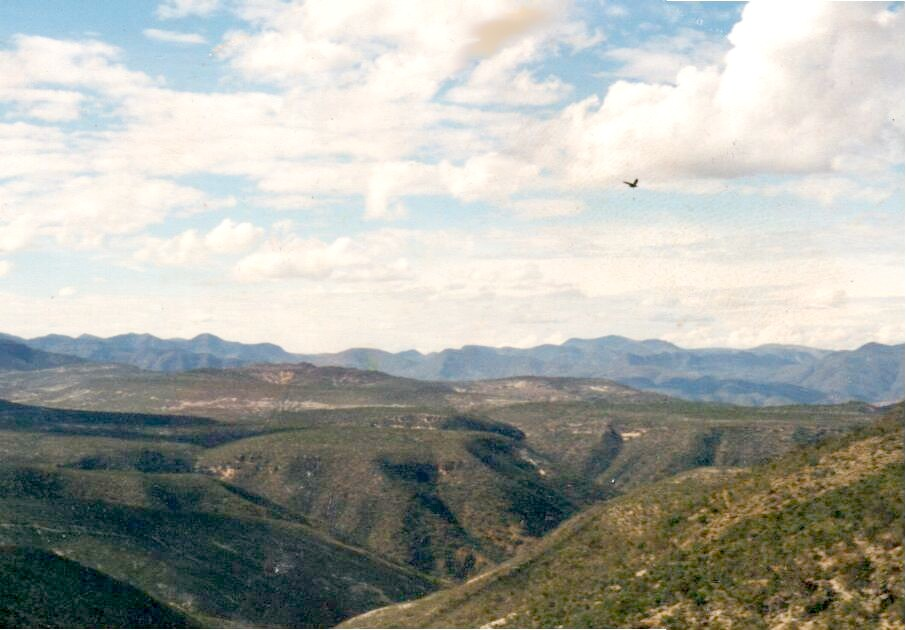
Sierra Mixteca, near Nativitas Monte Verde, in Oaxaca.

The Sierra Mixteca is a mountainous region located between the states of Puebla and Oaxaca in south-central Mexico, in the region known as La Mixteca.

It is also known as the Nudo Mixteco or Escudo Mixteco (Mixtec Shield) and, in Nahuatl, as Zempoaltépetl (meaning "twenty mountains"), which is also the name of the Cerro Zempoaltépetl, its highest peak (3400 m). In the Mixtec language it is called Ñuñume, the land of clouds.

The Sierra Mixteca is one of the oldest geological regions in the territory of Mexico. It stands at the convergence of the Sierra Madre Oriental, the Neo-Volcanic Axis, and the Sierra Madre del Sur. During the emergence of the two Sierra Madre ranges, the Mixtec Shield underwent intense erosion and faulting, which caused changes in the upper courses of the Rivers Balsas, Lerma and Papaloapan. During that geological process, which also involved high levels of volcanic activity, the rivers rising in the Sierra Mixteca carved out many deep canyons, further complicating the relief of the region. One of the most important valleys created during this period is the Tehuacán Valley, located in south-east Puebla, an area of mineral springs.

The Sierra Mixteca is one of the country's poorest regions in natural resources. Its inhabitants, who number some 200,000 are predominantly indigenous, mostly belonging to the Mixtec people, who engage in subsistence agriculture. The region lacks any major population centres and communications with the rest of the country are deficient.
