= Codex Vindobonensis Mexicanus I =

Pre-Columbian piece of Mixtec writing

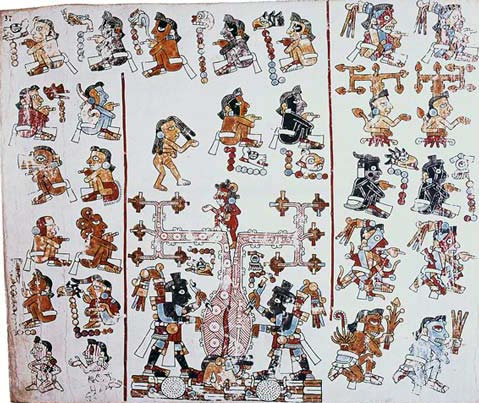
Fragment from Codex Vindobonesis

Codex Vindobonensis Mexicanus I, also known as Codex Vindobonensis C, or Codex Mexicanus I is an accordion-folded pre-Columbian piece of Mixtec writing. It is a ritual-calendrical and genealogical document dated to the 14th century.

== Contents ==
Codex Vindobonensis has 52 pages with size 26.5 by 22 cm. It was composed in a form of harmony with length 13.5 m. Its weight is 2.687 kg. The text is divided into 10 major sections. In the beginning it presents mythological genealogies of gods. It also contains lists of Mixtec rulers and priests.

== History ==
It is not certain where the codex was discovered. It was likely discovered in Veracruz and sent to Sevilla, together with the manuscript Codex Zouche-Nuttall, as a gift for Charles V in 1519. The later story of the codex is not well known, but it traveled to Portugal, Rome, Weimar, and finally Vienna.

The manuscript frequently changed owners and places in which it was housed. As a result, its name was changed 18 times. It was known as Codex Constantinopolitanus, Codex Byzantinus, and Codex Mexicanus I. The last name is more often used in the present day.

It is currently housed at the Austrian National Library at Vienna.

== See also ==
- Mixtec writing
- Mixtec Group
