= Mixtec monarchs =

Mixtec monarchs, also known as Mixtec kings and queens, were the centers of power for the Mixtec culture. Each Mixtec city-state (ñuu) was controlled by a dynasty of kings, and the rule of a city was usually inherited by the oldest son.

== Mixtec territory ==
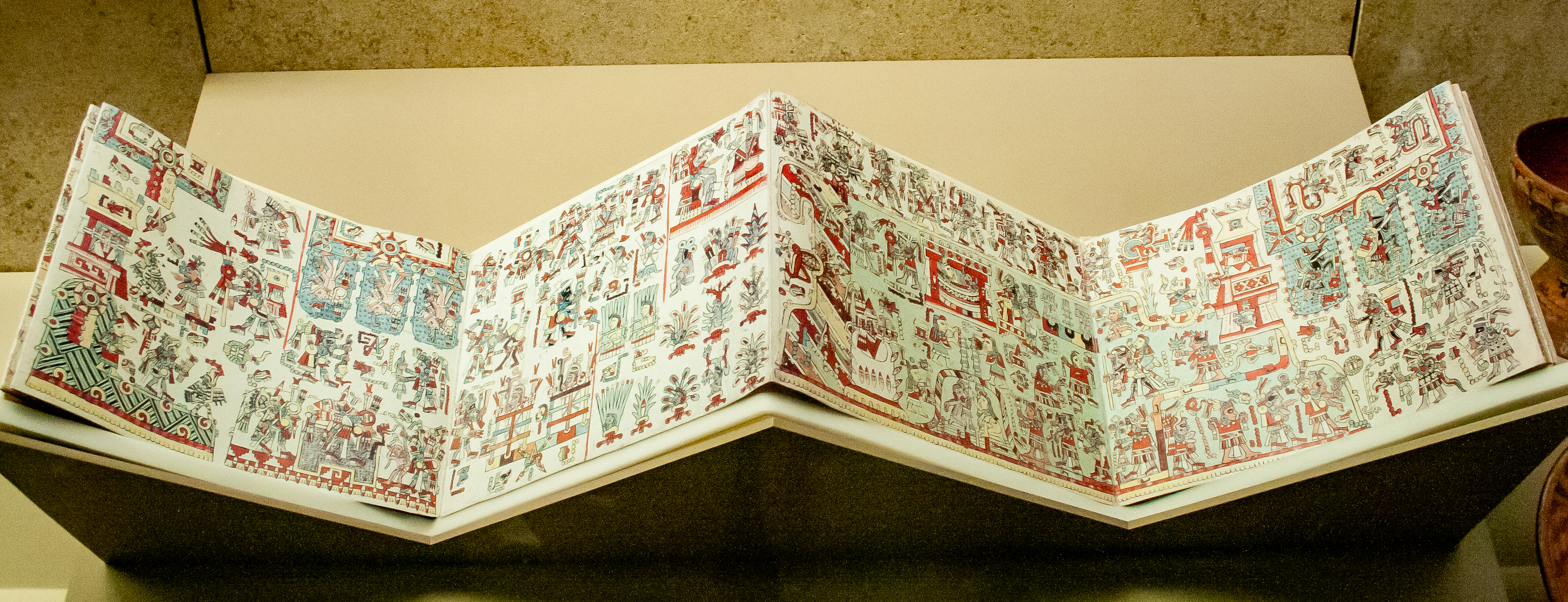
Codex Zouche-Nuttall Mixtec British Museum.

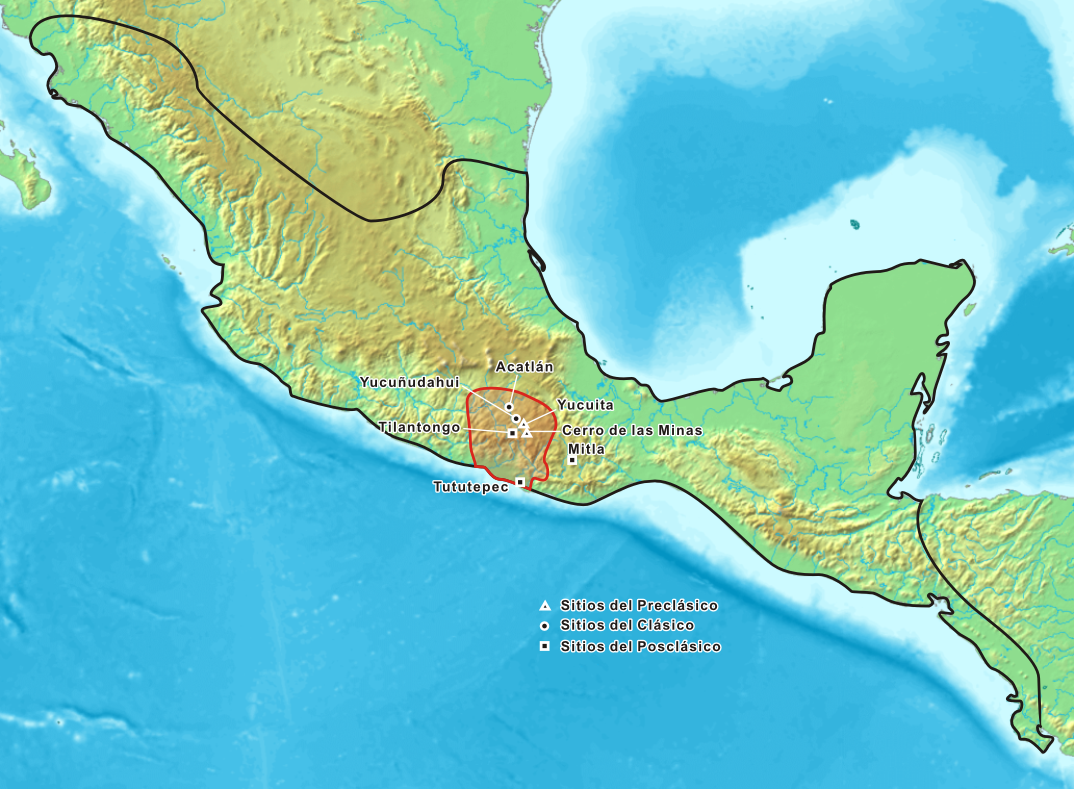
Map showing the historic Mixtec area. Pre-Classic archeological sites are marked with a triangle, Classic sites with a round dot, and Post-classic sites with a square.

In pre-Columbian times, the Mixtec were one of the major civilizations of Mesoamerica. The Mixtec territories are usually subdivided into three geographic areas: The Mixteca Alta or Highland Mixtec, living in the mountains in, around, and to the west of the Valley of Oaxaca; the Mixteca Baja or Lowland Mixtec living to the north and west of these highlands, and the Mixteca de la Costa or Coastal Mixtec living in the southern plains and the coast of the Pacific Ocean. The valley of Oaxaca itself was often a disputed border region, sometimes dominated by the Mixtec and sometimes by their neighbors to the east, the Zapotec.

The Mixtecs never formed a political unit that integrated all the villages occupied by members of that people, although the largest political unit known to that pre-Columbian nation was formed under the government of Eight Deer in Tilantongo. Nevertheless, for most of Mixtec history, the Mixteca Alta was the dominant political force, with the capitals of the Mixtec nation located in the central highlands, in important ancient centers such as Tilantongo, Achiutla, Cuilapan, Huajuapan, Mitla, Tlaxiaco, Tututepec, Juxtlahuaca, and Yucuñudahui.

The Mixtecs also made major constructions at the ancient city of Monte Albán (which had originated as a Zapotec city before the Mixtecs gained control of it).

== History ==
Mesoamerican Postclassic Mixtec sites.

The Postclassic is by far the best known period of pre-Hispanic Mixtec history, thanks to the preservation of oral history in colonial documents, but also to the codex that survived the destruction and the time after the arrival of the Spaniards in La Mixteca. It is also the period for which more rulers are known, and this information comes, not only from oral tradition, but also from those same codices.

In Mesoamerica, the Postclassic is marked by the flourishing of militaristic states. In fact, Mixtec populations were organized in small states hostile to each other, each headed by a city of first importance that ruled over other settlements subject to its authority. The construction of a hierarchical structure in the relations between the head towns of the Mixtec lordships (called ñuu) and their satellites (called siqui) is constant in Mixtec history, although in this period it is accentuated due to the increase in population and the political strategies of the ruling elites. This does not mean that societies of previous stages didn't wage war, as some city-states's walls date back to the first millennium BC, but in the Postclassic military activity mey have taken greater importance, as evidenced by the proliferation of paraphernalia associated with war and the cult of warrior deities throughout the region.

== Known rulers of Mixtec city-states ==
Notes:
- The names of the rulers are composed by the day of the birth + 'nickname'; as there is no distinction between males and females through names, rulers are assigned the usual gender symbols (♀ ♂); Colonial Christian names are written in **bold**.
- Most of the dates presented for the rulers' reigns are tentative and subject to change.
- The dynasty never breaks while a member of the family rules: the line goes through women if they ruled as queen regnants. However, if a child inherits different kingdoms of two reigning parents, the paternal line will be favoured.
- The lists may not be completed. However, take in consideration that some may be more completed than others in different aspects.

=== In Mixteca Costa ===
==== Acatepec, Yucu Yoo ====
- 1090-1097: ♀ Six Monkey 'War Quexquemitl' (usurper, deposed),
  - Sub-rulers ♂ 3 Alligator and ♂ 1 Movement
- 1097-1115: ♂ Eight Deer 'Jaguar Claw' (usurper)

==== Juquila, Ñuu Sitoho ====
- ?: ♂ One Death 'Sun Serpent', and ♀ Eleven Serpent 'Flower Quetzal Feathers' (wife) (parents-in-law of ♂ Six House, King of Tilantongo)

==== Tututepec (Yucu Dzaa) and Zacatepec (Yucu Chatuta) ====
- ?: Nizainzo Huidzo
- c.357: Mzatzin

Ruler	Born	Reign	City/Realm	Consort	Death	Notes
**2nd Tilantongo dynasty**
♂ Eight Deer 'Jaguar Claw'; Nacuaa 'Teyusi Ñaña'	5 October 1063; Tilantongo; Son of ♂ Five Alligator 'Sun Rain' (priest) and ♀ Eleven Water 'Jewel Bird'	1084 – 10 November 1115	Tututepec	♀ Thirteen Serpent 'Flowered Serpent' (of **Huachino**); 1103 five children ♀ Six Eagle 'Jaguar Spiderweb'; Ñusa 'Nduvua Cuiñe' (of **Chalcatongo)**; 1105 one child ♀ Ten Vulture 'Shining Quechquemitl' (of **Teita**); 1105 two children ♀ Eleven Serpent 'Jaguar Flower Turquoise Teeth' (of **Totomihuacan**); 1105 two children ♀ Six Wind 'Great Feathers of Noble Blood' (of **Cuyotepeji**) no children	10 November 1115; Tilantongo aged 52	Usurper and founder of a new royal line at Tilantongo. After his death Tututepec went to his murderer (and later son-in-law) Four Wind Fire Serpent.
**Pedernales-Achiutla dynasty**
♂ Four Wind 'Fire Serpent'; Quichi 'Yahui'	1092; Huachino; Son of ♂ Eleven Wind, King of Huachino and ♀ Six Monkey, Queen of Jaltepec	10 November 1115 – 1164	Tututepec	♀ Ten Flower 'Rain Spiderweb'; Sihuaco 'Nduvua Dzavui' (of **Tilantongo**); 1124 one child ♀ Five Lizard 'Zacate-Pulque Vase' (of **Deep Valley** ) 1124 or 1125 three children ♀ Five Wind 'Jade and Fur Ornament' (of **Tilantongo**); 1125 no children	1164; Pedernales aged 71–72	
♂ Eleven Jaguar 'Rain Fire Wall'	? Son of ♂ Four Wind	1120 – 1188	Zacatepec	Unknown at least one child	1188; Zacatepec	In 1120, he was given the settlement of Zacatepec by his father.
♂ Seven Lizard 'Sun Rain'; Saque 'Dzavui Ndicandii'	? Son of ♂ Eleven Jaguar	c.1188	Zacatepec	Unknown	?	

=== Main polities in Mixteca Alta and their direct dependencies ===
==== Tilantongo (Ñuu Tnoo) and Teozacoalco (Chiyo Cahnu) ====
Ruler	Born	Reign	City/Realm	Consort	Death	Notes
**1st Tilantongo dynasty**
♂ Ten House 'Jaguar'; Sicuau 'Cuiñe'	?	?	Tilantongo	♀ One Grass 'Puma'; Cacuañe 'Ñaña' (of **Apoala**) (born c.880) one child	?	First known ruler of the settlement.
♂ Three Eagle 'Eagle of the Serpent Place'	? Son of ♂ Ten House and ♀ One Grass	? – after 942	Tilantongo	♀ Four Rabbit 'Quexquemitl'; Quisayu 'Dzico' (of **Mitlatongo**) two children	after 942	
♂ Nine Wind 'Stone Skull'	942; Tilantongo; Son of ♂ Three Eagle and Four Rabbit	? – 1020	Tilantongo	♀ Five Reed 'Rain Hill' (of **Monte Albán-Achiutla**) c.990 three children	1020 aged 77–78	His brother, ♂ One Monkey, inherited their mother's city of **Mitlatongo**.
♂ Ten Flower 'Burnt-Eyed Jaguar'	992; Tilantongo; Son of ♂ Nine Wind and ♀ Five Reed	1020 – 1043	Tilantongo	♀ Two Serpent 'Plumed Serpent'; Cayo 'Coo Yodzo' (of **Suchixtlán**) (born 1005); 1013 six children	1043 aged 50–51	Many of his relatives are known to have sit exclusively in some thrones: ?: ♂ 10 Flower (II) Tail Arc (his brother-in-law; ruled in the settlement of **Dark Speckled Mountain** ); ?: ♂ 10 Reed (I) Precious Jaguar (his son-in-law; ruled in the settlement of **Tataltepec (Yucu Tatnu)**); ?: ♂ 10 Reed (II) (his son-in-law; ruled in the settlement of **Topiltepec, Yucu Quesi/Ñuu Ñañu** )
♂ Twelve Lizard 'Arrow Feet'	c.1013 Son of ♂ Ten Flower and ♀ Two Serpent	1043 – c.1080?	Tilantongo	♀ Four Flint 'Face Quetzal Feathers' (of **Topiltepec**) ♀ Four Alligator 'Jewel Face' (of **Topiltepec**) four children in total	c.1080? Tilantongo aged around 66-67	Married his nieces, daughters of his sister, ♀ Twelve Jaguar 'Jewel Spiderweb'.
♂ Five Movement 'Smoked Sky'	c.1030? Son of ♂ Twelve Lizard	1080 – ?	Tilantongo	♀ Four Death 'Jewel of the People' (of **Jaltepec**) no children ♀ Two Grass; 1073 one child	?	The succession of the son and grandson of Twelve Lizard is debated, as Lord 12 Lizard is the last of his dynasty explicitly depicted as king of Tilantongo before Eight Deer's conquest (1097). Even his grandson, who died young in a mysterious suicide ritual, is sometimes called by experts as an heir, instead of an official ruler. There isn't also any indication of the time of death of Lord 12 Lizard, which confuses matters. What is known is that, as Two Grass (Two Rain's mother) came from Visible Stones (a place under domination of Suchixtlán), Suchixtlán became influent in Tilantongo during this period of uncertainty. It's also possible that Twelve Lizard's sister, Lady 4 Rabbit ''Precious Quetzal'', was his next heiress, as, before usurping the throne, Lord 8 Deer had bowed to her and her husband in their town at Sosola (Acuchi).
♂ Two Rain 'Twenty Jaguars'; Cachi 'Ocoñaña'	1075; Tilantongo; Son of ♂ Five Movement and ♀ Two Grass	? – 18 June 1097	Tilantongo	Unmarried	18 June 1097; Tilantongo aged 21–22	
**2nd Tilantongo dynasty**
♂ Eight Deer 'Jaguar Claw'; Nacuaa 'Teyusi Ñaña'	5 October 1063; Tilantongo; Son of ♂ Five Alligator 'Sun Rain' (priest) and ♀ Eleven Water 'Jewel Bird'	18 June 1097 – 10 November 1115	Tilantongo	♀ Thirteen Serpent 'Flowered Serpent'; Siyo 'Ita Coo' (of **Huachino**); 1103 five children ♀ Six Eagle 'Jaguar Spiderweb'; Ñusa 'Nduvua Cuiñe' (of **Chalcatongo)**; 1105 one child ♀ Ten Vulture 'Shining Quechquemitl' (of **Teita**); 1105 two children ♀ Eleven Serpent 'Jaguar Flower Turquoise Teeth' (of **Totomihuacan**); 1105 two children ♀ Six Wind 'Great Feathers of Noble Blood' (of **Cuyotepeji**) no children	10 November 1115; Tilantongo aged 52	Usurper and founder of a new royal line at Tilantongo. After his death the influence in Mixtec realms passed to Pedernales, but the succession continued in Tilantongo. Lord 8 Deer was related to other settlements: His father-in-law, Lord 1 Deer Coanacoch is the only known ruler in the settlement of **Cuyotepeji**.
♂ Six House 'Jaguar Falling from Heaven'	1109; Tilantongo; Son of ♂ Eight Deer and ♀ Six Eagle	10 November 1115 – c.1150	Tilantongo	♀ Nine Movement 'Heart' (of **Juquila**); 1126 one child	c.1150 aged c.40-41	Children of Eight Deer, divided the realm in 1137.
♂ Four Dog 'Coyote Catcher'	1110; Teozacoalco; Son of ♂ Eight Deer and ♀ Thirteen Serpent	1137 – c.1150	Teozacoalco	♀ Four Death 'Jewel'; Quimahu 'Yusi' (of **Cuquila**) (born 1115); 1125 two children	c.1150 aged c.39-40	Children of Eight Deer, divided the realm in 1137.
♂ Five Water 'Stone Jaguar Heaven'	? Son of ♂ Six House and ♀ Nine Movement	c.1150 – 1175	Tilantongo	♀ Ten Reed 'Quetzal Jewel' (of **Tilantongo**) eight children	c.1175?	Married his cousin, daughter of his father's half-brother.
♂ Thirteen Dog 'Venus Eagle'	1132; Teozacoalco; Son of ♂ Four Dog and ♀ Four Death	c.1150 – 1170	Teozacoalco	♀ Eight Vulture 'Stone Quechquemitl' ♀ Four Rabbit 'Feathers on the Sand' two children in total	c.1170? aged 37-38?	
♂ Seven Water 'Red Eagle'	1149; Teozacoalco; Son of ♂ Thirteen Dog	c.1170 – 1190	Teozacoalco	♀ Eleven Water 'Precious Serpent'; Siituta 'Ñaña Coo' two children	c.1190 aged 40-41?	
♂ Eight Reed 'Pheasant'	1162; Son of ♂ Five Water and ♀ Ten Reed	c.1175 – 1185	Tilantongo	two children	c.1185? aged 22-23?	Sibling-spouses, ruled jointly.
♀ Five Rabbit 'Jewel'; Qhusayu 'Yusi'	c.1165 Daughter of ♂ Five Water and ♀ Ten Reed	c.1175 – 1185	Tilantongo	two children	c.1185? aged 19-20?	Sibling-spouses, ruled jointly.
♂ Two Movement 'Serpent with Markings'	? Son of ♂ Eight Reed and ♀ Five Rabbit	c.1185 – 1206	Tilantongo	♀ Four Eagle 'Blood Quechquemitl' (of **Teita**) ♀ Twelve Flint 'Hummingbird Jewel' (of **Yucuita**) ♀ Ten Eagle 'Serpent Spiderweb' (of **Yucuita**) three children in total	1206; Tilantongo	Apparently survived his own sons and heirs, Eight Grass Coyote Sacrificer and One Lizard Bloody Jaguar, and was succeeded by his grandchildren.
♂ Thirteen Eagle 'Sacred Rain'	? Son of ♂ Seven Water and ♀ Eleven Water	c.1190 – 1220	Teozacoalco	♀ Thirteen Death 'Jade Quechquemitl' two children ♀ Ten Deer 'Jaguar Quechquemitl' three children ♀ Eight Reed 'Precious Girl' one child ♀ Lady of the Staff of Respect no children ♀ Eleven Movement 'Jewel with Quetzal Feathers' two children ♀ Nine Monkey; Qhuñuu one child	c.1220	
♂ Twelve Reed 'Coyote Sun'; Cahuiyo 'Ñaña Ndicandii'	? Son of ♂ One Lizard 'Bloody Jaguar' (of Tilantongo) and ♀ Six Reed 'Jewel' (of Sunken Disk Plain)	1206 – c.1230	Tilantongo	before or c.1206 three children	c.1230?	Sibling-spouses and grandchildren of their predecessor. Ruled jointly.
♀ Three Jaguar 'Precious Butterfly Sun'; Cohuidzu 'Ñaña Tecuvua Ndicandii'	? Daughter of ♂ One Lizard 'Bloody Jaguar' (of Tilantongo) and ♀ Six Reed 'Jewel' (of Sunken Disk Plain)	1206 – c.1230	Tilantongo	before or c.1206 three children	c.1230?	Sibling-spouses and grandchildren of their predecessor. Ruled jointly.
♂ Eight Rabbit 'Fire of Tlaxiaco'; Nasayu 'Ñuhu Ndisi Nuu'	1189; Teozacoalco; Son of ♂ Thirteen Eagle and ♀ Eight Reed	c.1220 – 1255	Teozacoalco	♀ Six Grass 'Transparent Butterfly'; Ñucuañe 'Tecuvua Dzisi Andevui' (of **Tilantongo**) five children	c.1255? aged 65-66?	
♂ Five Rain 'Sun Movement'	? Son of ♂ Twelve Reed and ♀ Three Jaguar	c.1230 – 1260	Tilantongo	♀ Thirteen Lizard 'Truly Precious Butterfly'; Siiquevui 'Ñaña Tecuvua' (of **Puma** ) one child	c.1260?	♂ Five Rain was related to other settlements' rulers: ?: ♂ Seven Movement 'Bloody Jaguar', his father-in-law, is the only known ruler in the settlement of **Puma** .
♂ Twelve House 'Fire Serpent Flying in the Sky'	? Son of ♂ Eight Rabbit and ♀ Six Grass	c.1255 – 1290	Teozacoalco	five children	c.1290?	Sibling-spouses, ruled jointly.: Their brother, ♂ One House 'Jaguar Assassin from the Sky', ruled at Cántaros.
♀ Eleven Alligator 'Quetzal Jewel'	? Daughter of ♂ Eight Rabbit and ♀ Six Grass	c.1255 – 1290	Teozacoalco	five children	c.1290?	Sibling-spouses, ruled jointly.: Their brother, ♂ One House 'Jaguar Assassin from the Sky', ruled at Cántaros.
♂ Thirteen Wind 'Fire Serpent'; Sichi 'Yahui'	? Son of ♂ Five Rain and ♀ Thirteen Lizard	c.1260 – 1290	Tilantongo	♀ One Water 'Venus Quechquemitl' (of **Teozacoalco**); 1277 one child	c.1290	
♂ Nine Serpent 'Jaguar that Lightens the War'; Qhuyo 'Cuiñe Tnoo Yecu'	c.1280 Son of ♂ Thirteen Wind and ♀ One Water	c.1290 – 1320	Tilantongo	♀ Eight Flint (of **Yucuita**) ♀ Seven Flower (of **Yucuita**) four children in total	c.1320? aged 59-60?	
♂ Nine Movement 'Precious Water'; Qhuqhi 'Ñaña Tuta'	? Son of Twelve House and ♀ Eleven Alligator	c.1290 – 1321	Teozacoalco	no children	1321; Teozacoalco	Sibling-spouses, ruled jointly. Left no children.
♀ Two Jaguar 'Jade Spiderweb'	? Daughter of ♂ Twelve House and ♀ Eleven Alligator	c.1290 – 1321	Teozacoalco	no children	1321; Teozacoalco	Sibling-spouses, ruled jointly. Left no children.
**Zaachila-Teozacoalco dynasty**
♂ Two Dog 'Rope and Knives'	c.1290? Son of ♂ Five Flower, King of Zaachila and ♀ Four Rabbit (of Teozacoalco)	1321 – 1360	Teozacoalco	♀ Six Reed 'Plumed Serpent'; Ñuhuiyo 'Coo Yodzo' (of **Tilantongo**) three children	1360? aged 69-70?	Maternal nephew of his predecessors.
♂ Four Water 'Bloody Eagle'	1301; Son of ♂ Nine Serpent	c.1320 – 1341	Tilantongo	♀ Six Water 'Quetzal Jewel of Flower War' no children	1341; Tilantongo aged 39-40	Left no children, and his dynasty came to an end. He was succeeded by his widow.
**Zaachila-Teozacoalco dynasty**
♀ Six Water 'Quetzal Jewel of Flower War'	? Daughter of ♂ Two Dog, King of Teozacoalco and ♀ Six Reed	1341 – c.1355	Tilantongo	♂ Four Water, King of Tilantongo no children ♂ Four Death 'War Venus' (of **Tlaxiaco**); 1343 four children	c.1355	Widow and niece of the previous. As the eldest child of the only sister of king Four Water that had children, she became the inheritor of his uncle-husband's kingdom. She inherited it not as widow of her husband, but as a rightful heir of her uncle.
♀ Three Rabbit 'Divine Flame'; Casayu 'Ñuhu Sahmi'	1345; Tilantongo; Daughter of ♂ Four Death and ♀ Six Water	c.1355 – 1380	Tilantongo	1353 six children	c.1380?	Like her mother, she married her own uncle (her mother's brother), keeping the realm in the family, and made possible the reunion of Tilantongo and Teozacoalco.
♂ Nine House 'Mexican Jaguar'; Qhucuau 'Cuiñe Sahmi Nuu'	1323; Teozacoalco; Son of ♂ Two Dog and ♀ Six Reed	c.1360 – 1380	Teozacoalco (in Tilantongo in joint rule since 1355)	1353 six children	c.1380	
♂ Two Water 'Fire Serpent'; Catuta 'Yahui'	1357; Teozacoalco; Son of ♂ Nine House and ♀ Three Rabbit	c.1380 – 1415	Tilantongo and Teozacoalco	♀ 2 Vulture 'Flower Jewel' (of **Teita**) one child ♀ Three Alligator 'Jade Fan' (of **Zaachila**) six children ♀ Twelve Flint (of **Teita**) one child ♀ Four Reed 'Twenty Jaguars' no children	c.1415? aged 57-58?	After his death his inheritance is divided: His eldest daughter received Tilantongo; his first son got Teozacoalco, and his second son eventually inherited his mother's realm of Zaachila.
♀ Twelve Flower 'Broken Mountain Butterfly'; Cahuaco 'Tu'un Savi Tecuvua'	c.1380? Daughter of ♂ Two Water and ♀ Two Vulture	c.1415 – c.1430	Tilantongo	♂ Thirteen Eagle, King of Suchixtlán c.1390 four children	c.1430? aged 49-50?	Children of Two Water, divided the realm. Twelve Flower's children inherited Teozacoalco from her brother, as Five Rain's children went on to inherit their mother's at Tlaxiaco.
♂ Five Rain 'Water Falling from the Sky'	1402; Son of ♂ Two Water and ♀ Three Alligator	c.1415 – 1450	Teozacoalco	♀ Five Flower 'Quetzal Sun' (of **Tlaxiaco**); 1416 four children	c.1450? aged 47-48?	Children of Two Water, divided the realm. Twelve Flower's children inherited Teozacoalco from her brother, as Five Rain's children went on to inherit their mother's at Tlaxiaco.
♂ Six Deer 'Sacred Rain'	1393; Son of ♂ Thirteen Eagle, King of Suchixtlán and ♀ Twelve Flower	c.1430 – 1470	Tilantongo (with Teozacoalco since c.1450)	♀ Thirteen Wind 'Seed of the Broken Mountain' (of **Jaltepec**) c.1410? two children	after 1416 aged more than 22-23	Rejoined Tilantongo and Teozacoalco.
♂ Four Flower 'Pheasant'	1410; Teozacoalco; Son of ♂ Six Deer and ♀ Thirteen Wind	c.1470 – 1480	Tilantongo and Teozacoalco	♀ Seven Vulture 'Quetzal Fan' (of **Etlatongo**) seven children	c.1480 aged 69-70?	Probably during his reign, the capital of the dual kingdom of Teozacoalco-Tilantongo may have returned to Tilantongo, but this isn't certain.
♂ Ten Rain 'Sun Rain'; Sico 'Dzavui Ndicandii'	1438; Teozacoalco; Son of ♂ Four Flower and ♀ Seven Vulture	c.1480 – 1500	Tilantongo and Teozacoalco	♀ Five Wind 'Cocoa Flower' (of **Suchixtlán**) four children	c.1500 aged 61-62?	
♂ Four Deer 'Sharp-Eyed Eagle'; Quicuaa 'Yaha Ndisi Nuu'	1476; Teozacoalco; Son of ♂ Ten Rain and ♀ Five Wind	1500 – 1521	Tilantongo and Teozacoalco	♀ Eleven Serpent ♀ Twelve Vulture 'Sun Fan' (of **Jaltepec**) (born 1484) one child in total	1521; Teozacoalco aged 44–45	
♂ Four Deer 'Face of the Sun God'; **Juan de Mendoza**	c.1490? Tilantongo; Son of ♂ Four Deer	1521 – c.1540	Tilantongo and Teozacoalco	♀ **María de Estrada** 'White Quechquemitl' at least two children	c.1540? Tilantongo aged 49-50?	
♂ **Francisco de Mendoza I** 'Jaguar that Lightens the War'	c.1510? Tilantongo; First son of ♂ Four Deer **Juan de Mendoza** and **María de Estrada**	c.1540 – 1560	Tilantongo	Unknown one child	c.1560? Tilantongo aged 49-50?	Children of Juan de Mendoza, divided their inheritance, which was reunited by Felipe de Santiago after his niece's death. Felipe also claimed other polities, and was brieflly successful in obtaining Teposcolula (1563–1569), but he was shortly deposed by its heiress (and his sister-in-law), Catalina de Peralta.
♂ **Felipe de Santiago** 'Coyote with Staff'	c.1510? Tilantongo; Second son of ♂ Four Deer **Juan de Mendoza** and **María de Estrada**	c.1540 – 1576	Teozacoalco	♀ **Inés de Zárate** (of **Teposcolula**) at least two children	c.1580? Tilantongo aged 69-70?	Children of Juan de Mendoza, divided their inheritance, which was reunited by Felipe de Santiago after his niece's death. Felipe also claimed other polities, and was brieflly successful in obtaining Teposcolula (1563–1569), but he was shortly deposed by its heiress (and his sister-in-law), Catalina de Peralta.
♂ **Felipe de Santiago** 'Coyote with Staff'	c.1510? Tilantongo; Second son of ♂ Four Deer **Juan de Mendoza** and **María de Estrada**	1576 – c.1580	Tilantongo and Teozacoalco	♀ **Inés de Zárate** (of **Teposcolula**) at least two children	c.1580? Tilantongo aged 69-70?	Children of Juan de Mendoza, divided their inheritance, which was reunited by Felipe de Santiago after his niece's death. Felipe also claimed other polities, and was brieflly successful in obtaining Teposcolula (1563–1569), but he was shortly deposed by its heiress (and his sister-in-law), Catalina de Peralta.
♀ **Francisca de Mendoza**	c.1530? Tilantongo; Daughter of ♂ **Francisco de Mendoza I**	c.1560 – 1576	Tilantongo	Unknown no children	1576; Tilantongo aged 45-46?	Her death with no children led to the reunification of Tilantongo and Teozacoalco.
♂ **Francisco de Mendoza II**	c.1550? Tilantongo; Son of ♂ **Felipe de Santiago** and **Inés de Zárate**	c.1580 – 1600?	Tilantongo and Teozacoalco	♀ **Inés de Guzmán** (of **Yanhuitlán**) unknown children	1600? Tilantongo aged 49-50?	

===== San Pedro Coxcaltepec Cántaros (Ñuu Naha), branch of the Tilantongo line =====
Ruler	Born	Reign	Consort	Death	Notes
♂ One House 'Jaguar Assassin from the Sky'	? Son of ♂ Eight Rabbit, King of Teozacoalco and ♀ Six Grass	c.1255 – 1290	♀ Seven Water 'Lizard Jewel', Queen of Chindua at least one child ♀ Six Wind 'Transparent Spiderweb'; Ñuchi 'Nduvua Ndisi Andevui' (of **Sosola**) no children	c.1290?	
♂ Seven Movement 'War Coyote'; Saqhi 'Yecu Ñaña'	? Son of ♂ One House and ♀ Seven Water	c.1290 – 1330	♀ Five Dog 'Transparent Spiderweb'; Qhuhua 'Nduvua Ndisi Andevui' (of **Suchixtlán**) at least one child	c.1330?	
♂ Six Eagle 'Fire Serpent Who Took the Stone'	? Son of ♂ Seven Movement and ♀ Five Dog	c.1330 – 1360?	♀ Eleven Rabbit 'Feather that Went Sideways' (of **Suchixtlán**) at least one child	c.1360?	
♂ Ten Vulture 'Eagle that Lightens the War'; Sicuii 'Yaha Tnoo Yecu'	? Son of ♂ Six Eagle and ♀ Eleven Rabbit	c.1360 – 1390?	♀ Six Lizard 'Turquoise Feather' (of **Etlatongo**) at least one child	c.1390?	
♂ Ten Alligator 'Sun Rain'; Siquevui 'Dzavui Ndicandii'	? Son of ♂ Ten Vulture and ♀ Six Lizard	c.1390 – 1420?	♀ Seven Vulture 'God that Came Out Alive' (of **Tilantongo** (?)) at least one child	c.1420?	
♂ Six Death 'Sun Rain'; Ñumahu 'Dzavui Ndicandii'	? Son of ♂ Ten Alligator and ♀ Seven Vulture	c.1420 – 1461	♀ Two Flower, Queen of Suchixtlán c.1450? at least two children	1461	Ruled also in Suchixtlán, jointly with his wife.
♂ Three Dog 'Fire Serpent that came out from Heaven'	? Son of ♂ Six Death and ♀ Two Flower, Queen of Suchixtlán	1461 – c.1480	♀ Seven Grass 'Pearled Spiderweb' (of **Tiltepec**) no children	c.1480?	
♂ Eleven Grass 'Jaguar where God came Out'; **Felipe de Guzmán**	? Son of ♂ Three Dog and ♀ Seven Grass	c.1480 – 1500	♀ Seven Grass 'Sun Quechquemitl' no children	c.1500?	
**Jaltepec dynasty**
♂ Three Monkey 'Side Rain'; **Carlos de Guzmán**	? Son of ?	c.1500 – 1530	♀ Four Water 'Flowering Fan'; Quituta 'Ita Huichi' (of **Zahuatlán**) no children	c.1530?	
♂ Four Rain 'Sky Assassin'; **Andrés de Guzmán**	? Son of ♂ Three Monkey **Carlos de Guzmán** and ♀ Four Water	c.1530 – 1570	♀ Twelve Alligator 'Flower of the Turkey Hill' (of **Suchixtlán**) at least one child	c.1570?	
♂ Eight Water 'Sun Fire Serpent'; Natuta 'Yahui Ndicandii'; **Domingo de Guzmán**	? Son of ♂ Four Rain **Andrés de Guzmán** and ♀ Seven Grass	c.1570 – 1600	♀ **María Catalina** at least one child	c.1600?	
♀ One Jaguar; Cahuidzo; **María de Rojas**	? Son of ♂ Eight Water **Domingo de Guzmán** and ♀ **María Catalina**	c.1600 – 1620	♂ Two House, Cacuau **Gaspar** at least one child	c.1620?	
♀ Four Jaguar; Quihuidzo; **Marta de Guzmán**	? Daughter of ♂ Two House **Gaspar** and ♀ One Jaguar **María de Rojas**	c.1620 – 1640	♂ Six Lizard, Ñuque **Felipe Mejía** c.1610 no children	c.1640?	
♂ **José Mejía**	? Son of ♂ Six Lizard **Felipe Mejía** and ♀ Four Jaguar **Marta de Guzmán**	c.1640 – 1650	♀ **Inés de Alvarado** (of **Soyaltepec**) c.1632 two children	c.1650?	
♀ **Petronila de Alvarado**	? Daughter of ♂ **José Mejía** and ♀ **Inés de Alvarado**	c.1640 – 1655	♂ **Felipe de Rojas** no children	c.1655?	It is not certain if she succeeded or not to her father, despite never being associated to the polity, it is possible, by her position between her father and brother in the genealogy of the Codex Muro, that she succeeded first.
♂ **Juan de Alvarado**	? Son of ♂ **José Mejía** and ♀ **Inés de Alvarado**	c.1655 – 1670	♀ **Úrsula de Guzmán** c.1642 at least one child	c.1670?	
♂ **Domingo de Alvarado y Guzmán**	? Son of ♂ **Juan de Alvarado** and ♀ **Úrsula de Guzmán**	c.1670 – 1690	♀ **Marta de Zúñiga** ♀ **Felipa de Velasco** unknown children	c.1690?	

==== Jaltepec, Añute ====
Ruler	Born	Reign	Consort	Death	Notes
**Apoala-Jaltepec dynasty**
♂ Ten Reed 'Eagle'; Sihuiyo 'Yaha'	c.880? Son of ♂ Two Grass 'Death Serpent' (of Apoala) and ♀ Eight Rabbit 'Sun Headdress', Queen of Whirlpool of Blood-Temple of the Spiderweb and Smoke	? – after 920	♀ Two Lizard 'Venus Red and White Band' at least one child	after 920	
♂ Three Rain 'Ballcourt with Lines'	? Son of ♂ Ten Reed and ♀ Two Lizard	?	♀ Seven Death 'Rain Flaming Knot' no children	?	
**Suchixtlán dynasty**
♀ Nine Wind 'Stone Quexquemitl'	c.1010 Daughter of ♂ Eight Wind, King of Suchixtlán and Lady Ten Deer 'Jaguar Quexquemitl'	1027 – 1090	♂ Ten Eagle 'Stone Jaguar' (of **Tilantongo**); 1041 five children	1090; Jaltepec aged 79–80?	She had other siblings who ruled in distinct places. See Suchixtlán.
♀ Six Monkey 'War Quechquemitl'; Ñuñuu 'Dzico Yecu'	c.1050? Daughter of ♂ Ten Eagle and ♀ Nine Wind	1090 – 1101	♂ Eleven Wind, King of Huachino; 1090 two children	1101; Huachino aged 50-51?	Assassinated with her husband in Huachino during the Tilantongo coup d'état of ♂ Eight Deer 'Jaguar Claw'.
♂ One Alligator 'Ballcourt Eagle'; Caquevui 'Yaha Yahua'	1094; Huachino; Second son of ♂ Eleven Wind, King of Huachino and ♀ Six Monkey	1101 – c.1150	♀ Six Wind 'Feather Blood Quetzal' (of **Tilantongo**); 1122 one child ♀ Six Flint 'Precious Fire Serpent'; Ñucusi 'Ñaña Yahui' (of **Tilantongo**); 1122 no children	c.1150 Jaltepec aged 55-56?	Younger son of Six Monkey, inherited her settlement at Jaltepec and married two daughters of her assassin.
♂ Five Lizard 'Blood Jewel'	c.1122 Son of ♂ One Alligator and ♀ Six Wind	c.1150 – 1200	♀ Four Rain 'Heartcross' (of **Temazcal Cave of Atl Tlachinolli** ) ♀ Eight Rabbit (of **Temazcal Cave of Atl Tlachinolli** ) (Both women were sisters) three known children in total	c.1200? aged 79-80?	
♂ One Rain 'Celestial Eagle'; Caco 'Yaha Andevui'	? Son of ♂ Five Lizard	c.1200 – 1240	♀ Two Alligator 'Smoke Spiderweb' four children	c.1240?	
♂ Five Flower 'Celestial Eagle'; Qhuhuaco 'Yaha Andevui'	? Son of ♂ One Rain and ♀ Two Alligator	c.1240 – 1280	♀ Ten Water 'Xolotl Red Jewel' two children	c.1280?	
♂ Six Reed 'Jaguar Sun'; Ñucusi 'Cuiñe Ndicandii'	? Son of ♂ Five Flower and ♀ Ten Water	c.1280 – 1320	♀ Five Movement 'Copal Ornament' two children	c.1320?	
♂ Thirteen Wind 'Ballcourt War'; Sichi 'Yecu Yahua'	? Son of ♂ Six Reed and ♀ Five Movement	c.1320 – 1350	♀ Twelve Rain 'Butterfly Quetzal Blood' (of **Zahuatlán**) four children	c.1350?	
♂ Nine Lizard 'Fire Face'	? Son of ♂ Thirteen Wind and ♀ Twelve Rain	c.1350 – 1385	♀ Twelve Deer 'War Quexquemitl' (of **Cuauhtinchán**) three children	c.1385?	During his reign Zaachila attacked Jaltepec, took the eldest sons of Nine Lizard, and executed them. His minor son was the only one that survived. This son, Two Jaguar, would eventually succeed his father.
♂ Two Jaguar 'Jaguar Tlaltecuhtli Smoke'	c.1360? Son of ♂ Nine Lizard and Twelve Deer	c.1385 – 1400	♀ One Serpent 'Sun Fan' (of **Teozacoalco**); 1372 one child	c.1400? aged 39-40?	
♂ Five Water 'Sharp-Eyed Jaguar'; Qhututa 'Cuiñe Ndisi Nuu'	c.1375 Son of ♂ Two Jaguar and ♀ One Serpent	c.1400 – 1411	♀ Seven Rain 'Sharp-Eyed Fan' (of **Tlaxiaco**) two children	1411 aged 33-34?	
♂ Ten Monkey 'Celestial Rain'; Siñuu 'Dzavui Andevui'	1391; Jaltepec; Son of ♂ Five Water and ♀ Seven Rain	1411 – c.1430	♀ Two Water 'Xolotl-Jewel' (of **Yanhuitlán**); 1414 three children	c.1430? aged 38-39?	
♂ Three Death 'Grey Eagle'	c.1405? Son of ♂ Ten Monkey and ♀ Two Water	c.1430 – 1444	♀ Three Serpent 'Cocoa Garland' (of **Twisted Water Hill** ) c.1425 three children	1444; Jaltepec aged 38-39?	
♂ One Monkey 'Sun Rain'; Cañuu 'Dzavui Ndicandii'	1416; Jaltepec; Son of ♂ Three Death and ♀ Three Serpent	1444 – 1480	♀ Seven Water 'Plumed Sun' (of **Tilantongo-Teozacoalco**) (d.1477); 1447 at least one child ♀ Ten Movement 'Plumed Sun', Queen of Quetzaltepec no children	1480; Jaltepec aged 63–64	
♂ Four Serpent 'Bloody Eagle'	1451; Jaltepec; Son of ♂ One Monkey and ♀ Seven Water	1480 – 1520	♀ Five Monkey 'Seed of the Broken Mountain' (of **Tilantongo-Teozacoalco**) (1466–1518) two children	1520; Jaltepec aged 68–69	
**Zaachila-Teozacoalco dynasty**
♂ Thirteen Grass 'Fire Serpent'; Sicuañe 'Yahui'	1516; Jaltepec; Son of ♂ Four Deer, King of Teozacoalco and ♀ Twelve Vulture (of Jaltepec)	1520 – 1541	♀ Two Jaguar 'Jewel Red Objects Package' (of **Tlaxiaco**); 1523 five children ♀ Five Jaguar 'Cocoa Garland'	1541; Jaltepec aged 24–25	Maternal grandson of his predecessor.
♂ Ten Grass 'Jaguar Smoke Tlaltecuhtli' **Carlos de Villafañe**	1527; Jaltepec; Son of ♂ Thirteen Grass and ♀ Two Jaguar	1541 – c.1560	♀ Ten Serpent 'Flowered Tree Golden Band'; 1546 unknown children	c.1560 Jaltepec aged 32-33	
♂ **Ángel de Villafañe**	c.1540? Jaltepec; Son of ♂ Ten Grass **Carlos de Villafañe** and ♀ Ten Serpent	c.1560	?	? Jaltepec	

===== Place of Flints/Pedernales (Ñuu Yuchi), branch of the Jaltepec line =====
Ruler	Born	Reign	Consort	Death	Notes
**Pedernales-Achiutla dynasty**
♂ Four Wind 'Fire Serpent'; Quichi 'Yahui'	1092; Huachino; Son of ♂ Eleven Wind, King of Huachino and ♀ Six Monkey, Queen of Jaltepec	10 November 1115 – 1164	♀ Ten Flower 'Rain Spiderweb'; Sihuaco 'Nduvua Dzavui' (of **Tilantongo**); 1124 one child ♀ Five Lizard 'Zacate-Pulque Vase' (of **Deep Valley** ) 1124 or 1125 three children ♀ Five Wind 'Jade and Fur Ornament' (of **Tilantongo**); 1125 no children	1164; Pedernales aged 71–72	First known ruler of the settlement, which seems to have been separated either from Tilantongo or Jaltepec.
♀ Thirteen Flower 'Precious Bird'	c.1124/25 Daughter of ♂ Four Wind and Ten Flower	1164 – c.1170	♂ Four Alligator 'Sacred Serpent' (of **Tilantongo**) c.1138 ten children	c.1170? Pedernales aged 55-56?	
♂ Seven Eagle 'Flames'; Sasa 'Sahmi'	1138; Pedernales; First son of ♂ Four Alligator and ♀ Thirteen Flower	c.1170 – 1180	♀ Three Serpent 'Sacred Jewel' (of **Achiutla**) no children	c.1180? Pedernales aged 41-42?	Left no children and was succeeded by his brother.
♂ Four Jaguar 'War Jaguar'; Quihuidzu 'Cuiñe Yecu'	1144; Pedernales; Second son of ♂ Four Alligator and ♀ Thirteen Flower	c.1180 – 1190	♀ Eight Jaguar 'Serpent Jewel'; Nahuidzo 'Coo Yusi' (of **Achiutla**) at least one child	c.1190? Pedernales aged 50-51?	
♂ One Eagle 'Rain'; Casa 'Dzavui'	c.1173 Son of ♂ Four Water 'Jaguar Rain' (of Pedernales) and ♀ One Grass 'Eagle Wing' (of Achiutla)	c.1190 – 1223	Unmarried	1223; Pedernales aged c.49-50	Nephew of his predecessors.
♂ Seven Reed 'Pheasant'	? Son of ♂ Thirteen Serpent 'Eagle' (of Pedernales) and ♀ Eleven Deer 'Quetzal Jewel' (of Pedernales)	1223 – c.1240	?	c.1240? Pedernales	Cousin of his predecessor.
Pedernales annexed to Teozacoalco

===== Achiutla, (Ñuu Ndecu), branch of the Pedernales line =====
Pedernales-Achiutla dynasty

- 1164-?: ♂ Eleven Flower 'Cloud Xicolli' and ♀ Thirteen Wind 'Cloud Hair' (siblings and spouses, children of ♂ Four Wind, King of Ñuu Yuchi)
- ?: ♂ Ten Alligator 'Digging Stick' (son of previous; father-in-law of ♂ Two Wind, King of Tlaxiaco)
- ?: ♂ Eight Wind 'Smoked Claw' (brother-in-law of ♂ Twelve Deer, King of Tlaxiaco)
- ?: ♂ Seven Movement 'Blood Shedding Rain' (son-in-law of ♂ Eleven Wind, King of Tlaxiaco)
- ?: ♂ Nine Wind 'Sun Fire Serpent'
- ?: ♂ Ten Alligator 'Jaguar with Claws like Flints' (son of the previous)
- ?: ♂ Two Vulture 'Fire Serpent' (son of Four Serpent, king of Jaltepec, and son-in-law of Eight Grass, king of Tlaxiaco)

==== Suchixtlán, Chiyo Yuhu ====
Ruler	Born	Reign	Consort	Death	Notes
**Suchixtlán dynasty**
♂ Eight Wind 'Twenty Eagles'; Nachi 'Ocoyaha'	? Son or descendant of ♂ Three Rain, King of Jaltepec	? – 1027	♀ Ten Deer 'Jaguar Quechquemitl'; Sicuaa 'Dzico Cuiñe'; 1009 ♀ Ten Grass, Sicuañe; 1010 ♀ Ten Eagle, Sisa; 1011 seven children in total	1027; Suchixtlán or Jaltepec	
Hiatus with no known rulers
♂ Twelve Movement 'Jaguar that Burns the Mexicans'	?	c.1370?	♀ One Jaguar 'Divine Fan'; Cahuidzu 'Ñuhu Huichi' at least one child	?	
♂ Thirteen Eagle 'Bloody Jaguar'; Sisa 'Neñe Cuiñe'	? Son of ♂ 12 Movement and ♀ 1 Jaguar	c.1400-1430?	♀ Twelve Flower, Queen of Tilantongo four children	?	
**Zaachila-Teozacoalco dynasty**
♀ Two Flower 'Rising Jewel'	? Daughter of ♂ Thirteen Eagle and ♀ Twelve Flower	c.1430? – 1461	c.1450? two children	?	Spouses and explicitly co-rulers in Suchixtlán (according to Codex Muro). Lord 6 Death possibly also inherited his kingdom at San Pedro Cántaros.
♂ Six Death 'Sun Rain'; Ñumahu 'Dzavui Ndicandii'	? Son of ♂ Ten Alligator, king of Cántaros and ♀ Seven Vulture	c.1430? – 1461	c.1450? two children	1461	Spouses and explicitly co-rulers in Suchixtlán (according to Codex Muro). Lord 6 Death possibly also inherited his kingdom at San Pedro Cántaros.
♀ Eleven Monkey 'Jade Spiderweb'	? Son of ♂ Six Death and ♀ Two Flower	1461-c.1480?	three children	c.1480?	Probably ruled jointly, as despite she inherited the kingdom, her husband is said to have also ruled there.
♂ Four Death 'War Venus'	? Son of ♂ Six Deer, king of Tilantongo and ♀ Thirteen Wind (of Jaltepec)	1461-c.1480?	three children	c. 1480?	Probably ruled jointly, as despite she inherited the kingdom, her husband is said to have also ruled there.
♂ Eight Monkey; Nañuu	? Son of ♂ Four Death and ♀ Eleven Monkey	c.1480?	♀ Four Water 'Butterfly with Red Spots' (of **Tilantongo**) no children	?	
Hiatus with no known rulers
♂ Eight Movement 'Jaguar Rain Wall'	?	?	♀ Eight Flint 'Venus Legs Bent Strip' (of **Jaltepec**) (born 1528) c.1530/40? no children	?	Last known ruler of the town.

===== "Arrow-Red Liquid", branch of the Suchixtlán line =====
- c.1027-?: ♂ Thirteen Grass (son of ♂ Eight Wind, King of Suchixtlán)

===== "Seven Waters with Quetzals" and "Eagle Hill", branches of the Suchixtlán line =====
- c.1027-?: ♀ Nine Monkey 'Jade Skull' (daughter of ♂ Eight Wind, King of Suchixtlán), with ♂ Two Lizard 'Quetzal Turquoise Jaguar'
  - ?: ♂ Six Flower, with ♀ Eight Lizard (parents of Two Lizard; ruled at "Seven Waters Hill"; possibly the same place as "Seven Waters with Quetzals"?)
- ?: ♂ One Wind 'Rain Grass Knot' (son of ♀ Nine Monkey and ♂ Two Lizard)
- ?: ♀ One Water 'Hummingbird Fan' (sister of previous)
  - ?: ♂ One Dog 'Eagle Jaguar', their brother, ruled in "Eagle Hill".

==== Tlaxiaco (Ndisi Nuu) and Hill of the Mask ====
Ruler	Born	Reign	City/Realm	Consort	Death	Notes
**Tlaxiaco dynasty**
♂ Eight Jaguar 'Bloody Coyote'; Nahuidzu 'Neñe Ñaña'	1113; Tlaxiaco	1164 – c.1175	Tlaxiaco	♀ Two Vulture 'Jewel Fan'; Cacuii 'Yusi Huichi' two children	c.1175? aged 61-62?	First known king at Tlaxiaco, partition from Teozacoalco.
♂ Four Grass 'Sun Face'	? First son of ♂ Eight Jaguar and ♀ Two Vulture	c.1175 – 1210	Tlaxiaco	♀ Six Reed 'Venus Face' one child	c.1210?	Also king at Sosola (Acuchi).
♂ Two Wind 'Bloody Rain'; Cachi 'Neñe Dzavui'	? First son of ♂ Four Grass and ♀ Six Reed	c.1210 – 1230	Tlaxiaco	♀ Four Death 'Flame Fan'; Quimahu 'Sahmi Huichi' (of **Achiutla**) no children	c.1230?	Children of 4 Grass, divided their inheritance. 2 Wind left no children, and Tlaxiaco was inherited by his uncle. 1 Movement possibly survived his son, and was succeeded by his grandson.
♂ One Movement 'Fire Serpent with Feathers'	? Second son of ♂ Four Grass and ♀ Six Reed	c.1210 - 1270	Hill of the Mask	♀ Two House 'Precious Quechquemitl'; Cacuau 'Dzico Ñaña' one child	c.1270?	Children of 4 Grass, divided their inheritance. 2 Wind left no children, and Tlaxiaco was inherited by his uncle. 1 Movement possibly survived his son, and was succeeded by his grandson.
♂ Two Movement 'Fire Serpent in Flames'; Caqhi 'Yahui Sahmi'	? Second son of ♂ Eight Jaguar and ♀ Two Vulture	c.1230 - 1235	Tlaxiaco	♀ Two Death 'Plumed Sun' one child	c.1235?	
♂ Three Serpent 'Flame Rain'; Coyo 'Sahmi Dzavui'	? Son of ♂ Two Movement and ♀ Two Death	c.1235 - 1250	Tlaxiaco	♀ Twelve Wind 'Quetzal Jewel' ♀ Seven Death two children in total	c.1250?	
♂ One Deer 'Eagle'; Cacuaa 'Yaha'	? Son of ♂ Three Serpent	c.1250 - 1270	Tlaxiaco	♀ Ten Grass 'Precious Butterfly'; Sicuañe 'Ñaña Tecuvua' two children	c.1270?	
♂ Seven Serpent 'Eagle'; Sayo 'Yaha'	? Son of ♂ Four House (of Hill of the Mask) and ♀ Three House	c.1270 - 1300	Hill of the Mask	♀ Three Jaguar 'War Quexquemitl'; Cohuidzu 'Dzico Yecu' one child ♀ Four Serpent; Quiyo one child	c.1300?	Grandson of his predecessor.
♂ Twelve Rain 'Bloody Jaguar'; Caco 'Neñe Cuiñe'	? Son of ♂ One Deer and ♀ Ten Grass	c.1270 – 1305	Tlaxiaco	♀ One Monkey 'Jade Quechquemitl' (of **Tilantongo**) one child	1305; Tlaxiaco	
♂ Seven Rain 'Ascending Flame'	? Son of ♂ Seven Serpent and ♀ Four Serpent	c.1300-1338	Hill of the Mask	♀ Four Monkey 'Precious Fire Serpent'; Quiñuu 'Ñaña Yahui' (of **Tilantongo**) no children	1338; Hill of the Mask	
Hill of the Mask annexed to Teozacoalco
♂ Twelve Deer 'Serpent that Lightens the War'; Cacuaa 'Coo Tnoo Yecu'	? Son of ♂ Three Dog 'Venus Sun' (of Hill of the Mask) and ♀ Eight Serpent 'Sun Spiderweb' (of Tlaxiaco)	1305 – c.1330	Tlaxiaco	♀ Eleven Lizard 'Flame Jewel'; Siique 'Sahmi Yusi' (of **Achiutla**); 1305 no children ♀ Six Rabbit 'Jewel Seed' (of **Tilantongo**) no children	c.1330	It's possible that he succeeded his maternal grandfather in his mother's lifetime; she chose to follow her husband (12 Deer's father) in a peregrination. The male line is explicitly broken off after 12 Deer's death: he had no children. A succession crisis is opened, and is ultimately won by Lady 11 Rabbit, who was cleverly allied with Tilantongo-Teozacoalco.
**Pedernales-Achiutla dynasty**
♀ Eleven Rabbit 'Jewel of the Rising Sun'	? Daughter of ♂ Eight Wind, King of Achiutla and ♀ Ten Dog 'Flower War Butterfly' (of Tlaxiaco)	c.1330 - 1350	Tlaxiaco	two children	c.1350?	Spouses, ruled jointly. Lady 11 Rabbit (from Achiutla on paternal side) was also a maternal niece of Lord 12 Deer.
♂ Ten Rabbit 'Sharp-Eyed Jaguar'; Sisayu 'Cuiñe Ndisi Nuu'	? Son of ♂ Four Movement 'Rain Falling from the Sky' and ♀ Two Eagle 'Sunflower'	c.1330 - 1350	Tlaxiaco	two children	c.1350?	Spouses, ruled jointly. Lady 11 Rabbit (from Achiutla on paternal side) was also a maternal niece of Lord 12 Deer.
♂ Nine Rain 'Bloody Jaguar'; Qhuco 'Neñe Cuiñe'	? Son of ♂ Ten Rabbit and ♀ Eleven Rabbit	c.1350 – 1380	Tlaxiaco	♀ Seven Flint 'Quetzal Fan' (of **Teozacoalco**); 1343 three children	c.1380?	
♂ Eleven Wind 'Smoked Claw'	? Son of ♂ Nine Rain and ♀ Seven Flint	c.1380 – 1410	Tlaxiaco	♀ Four Grass 'Jewel Flower' (of **Achiutla**) five children	c.1410?	His sister, ♀ Six Wind, and her husband ♂ Lord 1 Dog, are the only known rulers in the settlement of **Feline Mountain** .
♂ One Monkey 'Sun Rain'; Cañuu 'Dzavui Ndicandii'	? Son of ♂ Eleven Wind and ♀ Four Grass	c.1410 – 1430	Tlaxiaco	♀ Five Flint 'Heavenly Fan'; Qhucusi 'Huichi Andevui' three children	c.1430?	
♂ Thirteen Eagle 'Sharp-Eyed Eagle'; Sisa 'Yaha Ndisi Nuu'	? Son of ♂ One Monkey and ♀ Five Flint	c.1430 – 1450	Tlaxiaco	♀ Eight Jaguar (of **Achiutla**) c.1400 one child	c.1450?	His heiress didn't succeed in the kingdom; his successor was his granddaughter.: ♂ Three Reed 'Smoked Eye', his brother, is the only known ruler in the settlement of **Cuilapán**.
**Zaachila-Teozacoalco dynasty**
♀ Eight Deer 'Quetzal Spiderweb'	? Daughter of ♂ Five Rain, King of Teozacoalco and ♀ Five Flower 'Quetzal Sun' (of Tlaxiaco)	c.1450 – 1460	Tlaxiaco	♂ Ten Alligator 'Stone Claw', King of Achiutla no children	c.1460?	Her twin brother ascended in the Zapotec throne of Zaachila as Cosijoeza.
♂ Three Serpent 'Venus Sun'	? Son of ♂ Five Rain, King of Teozacoalco and ♀ Five Flower (of Tlaxiaco)	c.1460 – 1470	Tlaxiaco	♀ Ten Movement 'Sun Jewel' no children	c.1470?	Younger brother of the twins.
♂ Eight Grass 'Sun Rain'; Nacuañe 'Dzavui Ndicandii' (Malinaltzin)	c.1435 Tlaxiaco; Son of ♂ Five Rain, King of Teozacoalco and ♀ Five Flower (of Tlaxiaco)	c.1470 – 1503	Tlaxiaco	♀ Nine Deer 'Jewel Flower'; Qhucuaa 'Yusi Ita'; 1460 one child ♀ One Serpent 'Butterfly Quetzal Feathers' no children	1511; Tlaxiaco aged 75–76	Younger brother of the predecessor. In 1503 Tlaxiaco was defeated by the Aztec Empire.
Tlaxiaco annexed to the Aztec Empire

=== Secondary polities in Mixteca Alta ===
==== Andua ====
- c.887: ♂ Twelve Vulture 'Golden Eagle'
- ?: ♂ Three Monkey 'Mexican Jaguar'

==== Atoyaquillo ====
- ?: ♂ Two Water with ♀ Ten Alligator
- ?: ♂ Thirteen Dog 'Venus Eagle' (grandson of the previous)

==== Black Altar ====
- ?: ♂ Ten Flint 'Skull' with ♀ Eight Death 'Quetzal Performer of the Earth Sacrifice'

==== Broken Mountain ====
- ?: ♀ One Death

==== Bulto de Xipe/Huachino ====
- c.950-1010: ♂ Ten Movement 'Earth Face'
- 1010-1070: ♂ Twelve Lizard 'Arrow Feet' (nephew of the previous)
- 1070-1101: ♂ Eleven Wind 'Blood Jaguar' (son of the previous)
  - To Tilantongo (1101–1115) and Ñuu Yuchi (1115–1164)
- ?: ♂ Six Vulture 'Jaguar with Knife' (son of ♂ Nine Rain of Tlaxiaco)

==== Chalcatongo, Ñuu Ndaya ====
- c.1083: ♂ Eight Aligator 'Bloody Coyote'
  - ?: ♂ Three Dog (son-in-law of ♂ Eight Alligator, in the settlement of Santa Catarina Yuxia, Yuu Usa)
- ?: ♂ Thirteen Jaguar 'War Beard' (descendant)

==== Comaltepec ====
- ?: ♂ Nine Jaguar 'Jaguar Sun' (brother-in-law of ♂ Three Death, king of Jaltepec)
- ?: ♂ Two Flint 'Sun Rain'
- ?: ♀ Two Movement 'Xolotl Butterfly' (daughter of previous) with her husband ♂ Eleven Jaguar 'Bloody Words'

==== "Copal Land" ====
- c.887: ♂ Eight Dog 'Alligator Celestial Support'

==== Cuquila, Ñuu Cuiñe ====
Ruler	Born	Reign	Consort	Death	Notes
**Cuquila dynasty**
♂ Twelve Wind 'Turquoise Serpent'	?	?	♀ One Eagle 'Jewel Hand' (of **Tilantongo**(?)) two children	?	First known ruler of the polity.
♂ Three Flint 'Eagle'; Cocusi 'Yaha'	? Son of ♂ Twelve Wind and ♀ One Eagle	?	♀ Seven Rabbit 'Plumed Serpent'; Sasayu 'Coo Yodzo' (of **Cuevas**) at least one chilld	?	Had a brother, ♂ Five Dog 'Coyote'.
♂ Twelve Flower; Cahuaco	? Son of ♂ Three Flint and ♀ Seven Rabbit	?	♀ Nine Lizard 'Arrow Jewel'; Qhuque 'Nduvua Yusi' at least one child	?	
♂ Ten Reed 'Fire Serpent in Flames'	? Son of ♂ Twelve Flower and ♀ Nine Lizard	?	♀ Eight Rain 'Life in Heaven's Corner' (of **Nundaca**) at least one child	?	
♂ Seven Eagle 'Sky Movement'	? Son of ♂ Ten Reed and ♀ Eight Rain	?	♀ Four Lizard 'Great Feather Sun' (of **Chalcatongo** or **Duraznos**) two children	?	
♂ Ten Dog 'Serpent Eye'; Sihua 'Nuu Coo'	? Son of ♂ Seven Eagle and ♀ Four Lizard	?	♀ Thirteen Dog 'Butterfly Fire Serpent' (of **Cuevas**) one child	?	
♂ Four House 'Wolf'	? Son of ♂ Ten Dog and ♀ Thirteen Dog	?	♀ Four Vulture 'Parrot Jewel' at least one child	?	
♀ Seven Vulture 'Divine Beard'	? Son of ♂ Four House and ♀ Four Vulture	?	♂ Two Rain 'Passgame with Eyes' (of **Temple of Knives** ) at least one child	?	
♂ Ten Lizard 'Fire Serpent Sun'; Sique 'Yahui Ndicandii'	? Son of ♂ Two Rain and ♀ Seven Vulture	?	♀ Nine Vulture 'Parrot Jewel' (of **Ñaña Ndidzo**) at least one child	?	
♂ Twelve Water 'Jaguar with Marked Eye'	? Son of ♂ Ten Lizard and ♀ Nine Vulture	?	♀ Four Rabbit 'Blue Butterfly Turtle' two children	?	
♂ One Flint 'Jewel'; Cacusi 'Yusi'	? Son of ♂ Twelve Water and ♀ Four Rabbit	?	♀ Eleven Movement 'Living Sun'; Siiqhi 'Tacu Ndicandii' (of **Zapotitlán**) two children	?	Had a sister, ♀ Eight Deer 'Great Feathers of Death'.
♂ ? 'Venus Rain'	? Son of ♂ One Flint and ♀ Eleven Movement	?	♀ ? Vulture 'Black Quechquemitl' two children	?	Name unknown. His sister, ♀ Four Wind 'Jewel Spiderweb', married ♂ Nine Reed 'Curved Staff', king of Acatlán.
♂ Seven Jaguar 'Bloody Coyote that Grabs Life'	? Son of ♂ ? 'Venus Rain' and ♀ ? Vulture 'Black Quechquemitl'	?	♀ Seven Wind 'Flowered Jewel'; Sachi 'Ita Yusi' at least one child	?	Had a sister, ♀ Twelve Wind.
♂ Five Flint 'Sun Rain'; Qhucusi 'Dzavui Ndicandii'	? Son of ♂ Seven Jaguar and ♀ Seven Wind	?	♀ Thirteen Monkey 'Plain Where God Rises' two children	?	
♂ Ten Flint 'Who Has an Alligator on His Hand'	? Son of ♂ Five Flint and ♀ Thirteen Monkey	?	♀ Thirteen Vulture 'Sun Rain'; Sicuii 'Dzavui Ndicandii' (of **Malinaltepec**) one child	?	Had a sister, ♀ Four Deer 'Living Sky'.
♂ Thirteen Monkey 'Marked Eye Movement'	? Son of ♂ Ten Flint and ♀ Thirteen Vulture	?	♀ Four Wind 'Butterfly Fire Serpent' (of **Tequixtepec**) one child	?	
♂ Five House 'Rain Knife'	? Son of ♂ Thirteen Monkey and ♀ Four Wind	?	♀ Two Deer 'Parrot Jewel' (of **Acatlán**) one child	?	
♂ Four Monkey 'Fire Serpent with Arrow in Hand'	? Son of ♂ Five House and ♀ Two Deer	?	♀ One Monkey 'Alligator Jewel' (of **Acatlán**) one child	?	
♂ Five Eagle 'Eagle with Bloody Claw'	? Son of ♂ Four Monkey and ♀ One Monkey	?	♀ Twelve Rain 'Toltec Flower' (of **Tequixtepec**) one child	?	
♂ Six Movement 'Hummingbird with Flames'	? Son of ♂ Five Eagle and ♀ Twelve Rain	?	♀ Nine Wind 'Sky Butterfly' (of **Bird Peak Hill** ) two children	?	
♂ Six Lizard 'Jaguar with Marked Eye'	? Son of ♂ Six Movement and ♀ Nine Wind	?	♀ Ten Water 'Living Sun'; Situta 'Tacu Ndicandii' (of **Valley of the Monkey and the Green Leaves** ) four children	?	Had a sister, ♀ Eleven Eagle.
♂ Nine Flint 'Wolf'	? Son of ♂ Six Lizard and ♀ Ten Water	?	♀ Four Serpent 'White Quetzal' three children	?	His sister ♀ Three Death married the king of Cholula, ♂ Five Movement. Nine Flint's brother ♂ Five Serpent ruled the polity of "Place of Hand with Plant".
♂ Eleven Reed 'Passgame Eagle'	? Son of ♂ Nine Flint and ♀ Four Serpent	?	♀ Six Serpent 'Living Sun'; Ñuyo 'Tacu Ndicandii' (of **Ixcuinatoyac** ) seven children	?	His sister ♀ Four Flint married the ruler of Yeloixtlahuaca, ♂ Five Serpent.
♀ Six Rain 'Green Feathers Flower	? Daughter of ♂ Eleven Reed and ♀ Six Serpent	?	♂ ? 'Sun Rain' ? 'Dzavui Ndicandii' one child	?	Last documented ruler in the Codex. She had a son, but his name is unreadable.

==== "Dark Place" ====
Ruler	Born	Reign	Consort	Death	Notes
**Dark Place dynasty**
♂ One House 'Fire Serpent'; Cacuau 'Yahui'	?	?	♀ ? Flint 'Flowered Jewel' two children	?	First known ruler of the polity.
♂ ? 'Fire'	? Son of ♂ One House and ? Flint	?	♀ Seven Grass 'Parrot Jewel' (of **Place of Beans** ) two children	?	
♂ Four Movement 'Sky Fire'	? Son of ? and ♀ Seven Grass	?	♀ Thirteen Death 'Great Feathers' (of **War City Hill** ) two children	?	
♂ Three Death 'Jaguar Falling from the Sky'	? Son of ♂ Four Movement and ♀ Thirteen Death	?	♀ Eight Eagle 'Great Feathers' (of **Place of the Net** ) two children	?	
♂ Three Dog 'Passgame Eagle'	? Son of ♂ Three Death and ♀ Eight Eagle	?	♀ One Dog 'Fan Jewel' (of **War Altar** ) one child	?	
♂ Five Rain 'Coyote Sun'	? Son of ♂ Three Dog and ♀ One Dog	?	♀ ? Monkey 'Arrow Jewel' (of **Tilantongo** (?)) three children	?	
♂ Eleven Flint 'Eagle of Precious Feathers'	? Son of ♂ Five Rain and ♀ ? Monkey	?	♀ Thirteen Reed 'Flower Garland' (of **Altar of the Rosette** ) two children	?	His sister ♀ Twelve Vulture married ♂ Three Monkey, ruler of Tecomaxtlahuaca.
♂ Six Rabbit 'Eagle Falling from the Sky'	? Son of ♂ Eleven Flint and ♀ Thirteen Reed	?	♀ Ten Wind 'Sun Spiderweb' (of **Skull Plain** ) one child	?	His sister ♀ Seven House married ♂ Two Rabbit, ruler of Juxtlahuaca.
♂ Three Wind 'Jaguar with Marked Eye'	? Son of ♂ Six Rabbit and ♀ Ten Wind	?	♀ Eleven Alligator 'Flower from where God Appeared' (of **Tecomaxtlahuaca**) no known children	?	Last known ruler of the settlement.

==== "Deep Valley" ====
- c.1100?: ♂ Twelve Dog 'Eagle' with ♀ Five Lizard 'Pulque-Zacate Vase' (wife) (parents-in-law of ♂ Four Wind, king of Pedernales)

==== Etlatongo, Yucunduchi ====
- ?: ♂ Six Jaguar 'War Words Centipede' (brother-in-law of ♂ Five Water, King of Jaltepec)
- c.1449?: ♂ Three Monkey 'Burning Jaguar' (brother-in-law of ♂ Six Deer, King of Tilantongo-Teozacoalco)
- ?: ♂ Ten Water 'Knife Rain' (son of previous)

==== "Feline Mountain" ====
- ?: ♂ One Dog (brother-in-law of ♂ Eleven Wind, King of Tlaxiaco)

==== "Hill of the Flower Tree" ====
- ?: ♂ Five Flower 'Ballcourt', with ♀ Five Flower 'Jewel Fist with Hole'

==== "Hill of White Alligator Skin" ====
- c.887: ♂ One Reed, with ♂ Ten Vulture

==== "Hill of the Moon" ====
- c.1096-1097: ♂ Three Alligator

==== "Hill of the Wasp" ====
- ?: ♂ Ten Movement 'Arrow'
- ?: ♂ Four Rabbit 'Jaguar who Carries an Aligator on his Chest'

==== "Hill of the Rabbit with Copper Axe" ====
- ?: ♂ Two Wind 'Lion'

==== "Hill of the Seated Little Man" ====
- c.887: ♂ Ten Movement 'Eagle with Flints'

==== Ixpantepec ====
- ?: ♂ One Jaguar, with ♀ One Flower
- ?: ♂ Seven Monkey 'Precious Dart Thrower' (grandson of the previous)

==== "Monkey" ====
- ?: ♂ Seven Grass 'Bloody Jaguar'

==== Mitlatongo, Dzandaya ====
- c.950/960?: ♂ One Monkey (brother of ♂ Nine Wind, king of Tilantongo)

==== "Mud Valley" ====
- ?: ♂ Ten Movement 'Flower Shield', with ♀ One Movement 'Quetzal'

==== "Place of the Ceremonies" ====
- ?: ♂ Five Serpent 'Performer of the Earth Sacrifice', with ♀ Eight Flower 'Blood of the Dark Place'

==== "Place of the Drum" (Soyaltepec, Añuu?) ====
- ?: ♂ Four Lizard 'Serpent that Carries the Sky', with ♀ Eight House 'Visible on Earth'
- ?: ♂ Four Jaguar 'Serpent War Snare'

==== "Place of the Man Who Points to the Sky" ====
- c.887: ♂ Five Serpent, with ♀ Four House

==== "Place of the Jaguar Skin Breast" ====
- c.887: ♂ One Dog, with ♂ Ten Monkey

==== "Place of Tlaltecuhtli" ====
- c.887: ♂ Seven Jaguar, with ♂ Five Rain

==== "Place Where the Sacred Arrow is Kept" ====
- ?: ♂ Ten Dog 'War Foot', with ♀ Eight Grass 'Cloud of the Mixtecs'

==== "Puma" ====
- ?: ♂ Seven Movement 'Bloody Jaguar' (father-in-law of ♂ Five Rain, King of Tilantongo)

==== "Quetzal" ====
- ?: ♂ Four Flint 'Face with Quetzal Feathers'

==== Quetzaltepec ====
- ?: ♀ Ten Movement 'Sun Rhomb' (wife of ♂ One Monkey, king of Jaltepec)

==== Río de la Serpiente ====
- ?: ♂ Three Eagle

==== Sachio ("Temple where the Alligator is Born") ====
- c.887: ♂ Two Rabbit 'Gray Eagle'

==== Sosola, Acuchi ====
- c.1079: ♂ Ten Flower 'Tail Arc' (son-in-law of ♂ Ten Flower, King of Tilantongo)
- c.1174?: ♂ Four Grass 'Sun Knife' (son of ♂ Eight Jaguar, King of Tlaxiaco)
- ?: ♂ Seven Serpent 'Sun Knife' (great-grandson of previous)

==== Tamazola (Deque Ñaña) and Topiltepec (Yucu Quesi/Nuu Tatnu) ====
- ?: ♂ Two Grass, with ♀ Thirteen Grass
- c.1040?: ♂ Ten Reed 'Carrier of the Flint Staff' (son of the previous; brother-in-law and father-in-law of ♂ Twelve Lizard, king of Tilantongo)
- c.1080?: ♂ Twelve Water 'Sky Jaguar' (son of ♂ Twelve Lizard, king of Tilantongo, and ♂ maternal grandson of Ten Reed)

==== Teita, Ticodzo ====
- c.1040: ♂ Thirteen Death (son-in-law of ♂ Ten Flower, king of Tilantongo; father-in-law of ♂ Eight Deer, king of Tilantongo)
- c.1165?: ♀ Ten Vulture 'Jade Fun' and ♂ Ten Rabbit 'Heart' (son of ♂ Five Water, king of Tilantongo)
- c.1430?: ♂ Seven Grass 'Blood Jaguar' (son-in-law of ♀ Six Water, queen of Tilantongo)
- c.1450?: Thirteen Wind (son of the previous)
- ?: ♂ Thirteen Jaguar 'War Eagle'
- c.1480?: ♂ Ten Deer 'Eagle Red Flowers'
- c.1500?: ♂ Eleven Jaguar 'Blood Words' (son of the previous)

==== "Temple of the Jawbone and the Red Century Plant" ====
- c.887: ♂ Ten Grass 'Stone Shield'

==== "Temple of the Plant" ====
- ?: ♂ Seven Flower 'Jaguar Bird Mountain', with ♀ Five Flint 'Cave Dame'

==== "Thirteen Plants" ====
- ?: ♂ Twelve Wind 'Smoked Eye', with ♀ Three Flint 'Jade Quechquemitl'

==== Tequixtepec ====
- c.1430: ♂ Three Wind 'Bloody Eagle' (brother-in-law of ♂ Three Death, king of Jaltepec)

==== Tezoatlán, Ñuu Siya ====
- ?: ♂ Five Alligator 'Rain'
- ?: ♂ Six Eagle 'Flower Jewel' (daughter of the previous)
- ?: ♂ Nine Deer 'Jade Bone, Flute' (son of previous, and father of ♂ Twelve Lizard of Huachino)

==== Water Rubber Ball (Chacahua? Manialtepec?) ====
- ?: ♂ Nine Serpent (deposed)
- ?-1115: ♂ Eight Deer 'Jaguar Claw' (usurper)

==== Yanhuitlán, Yodzocahi ====
Ruler	Born	Reign	Consort	Death	Notes
♂ Six Water 'Multicolored Feathers'	?	c.1320	?	?	Little is known about this ruler.
Hiatus with no known rulers
♂ Nine House; Qhucuau; **Francisco Calci**	?	c.1521 – 1525	?	1525?	Little is known about this ruler.
♀ One Flower 'Jaguar Quechquemitl'; Cahuaco 'Dzico Cuiñe'	c.1480? Daughter of ♂ Nine House **Francisco Calci**	c.1525 – 1535?	at least one child	?	Spouses, ruled jointly.
♂ Eight Death 'War Venus'	c.1480? Son of ♂ Ten Rain, King of Tilantongo-Teozacoalco and ♀ Five Wind	c.1525 – 1535?	at least one child	?	Spouses, ruled jointly.
♀ Two House; Cacuau; **María Coquahu**	? Daughter of ♂ Eight Death and ♀ One Flower	c.1535? – 1540	at least one child	1540	Spouses, ruled jointly.
♂ Six Movement; Nuqhi; **Diego Nuqh**	?	c.1535? – 1540	at least one child	?	Spouses, ruled jointly.
Regency of ♂ Seven Monkey **Domingo de Guzmán**, brother of María (1540-1558)					
♂ Seven Monkey; Sañuu; **Gabriel de Guzmán**	1537; Son of ♂ Six Movement **Diego Nuqh** and ♀ Two House **María Coquahu**	1540 – 1591	♀ **Isabel de Rojas** at least one child	1591 aged 53-54	

==== Yucuita (Flower Mountain) ====
- c.1270?: ♂ Six Death (father-in-law of ♂ Nine Serpent, king of Tilantongo)
- c.1355?: ♂ Thirteen Lizard 'Bloody Rain' (brother-in-law of ♀ Three Rabbit, queen of Tilantongo)
- c.1470?: ♂ Eleven Jaguar (father-in-law of ♀ Thirteen Grass 'Serpent with Markings', a brother of ♂ Ten Rain, king of Teozacoalco)

==== Zahuatlán (Mountain of the Warrior) ====
- c.887: ♂ Four Grass 'Blood Eagle'
- c.1300?: ♂ Five Dog 'Lame Jaguar' with ♀ Seven Movement 'Jewel Spiderweb' (parents-in-law of ♂ Thirteen Wind, King of Jaltepec)

=== In Mixteca Baja ===
==== Acatlan, Yucu Yuxi/Yuta Tisaha ====
- ?: ♂ One Rain
- ?: ♂ Nine Reed 'Curved Staff' (son of the previous)
- ?: ♂ Six Deer (son of the previous)
- ?: ♂ Four Dog (son of the previous)
- ?: ♂ Eight Flint (son of the previous)
- ?: ♂ Eight Alligator (son of the previous)
- ?: ♂ Seven Monkey (son of the previous)
- ?: ♂ Eight Movement (son of the previous)
- ?: ♂ Nine Flint (son of the previous)
- ?: ♂ Six Water (son of the previous)
- ?: ♂ Four Eagle (son of the previous)
- ?: ♂ Ten Reed (son of the previous)
- ?: ♂ Four Flower (son of the previous)
- ?: ♂ Four House (son of the previous)
- ?-1519/20: Unknown (son of the previous)
  - To the Spanish

==== Chila, Toavui ====
- ?: ♂ Ten Flint
- ?: ♂ Four Deer (son of the previous)
- ?: ♂ One Eagle (son of the previous)
- ?: ♂ Thirteen Dog (son of the previous)
- ?: ♂ Thirteen Reed (son of the previous)
- ?: ♂ Two Monkey (son of the previous)
- ?: ♂ Ten Monkey (son of the previous)
- ?: ♂ Ten Movement (son of the previous)
- ?: ♂ Three House (son of the previous)
- ?: ♂ Eight Wind (son of the previous)
- ?: ♂ Six Rabbit (son of the previous)
- ?: ♂ Thirteen Death (son of the previous)
- ?: ♂ One House (son of the previous)
- ?: ♂ Five Monkey (son of the previous)
- ?-1519/20: ♂ Four Dog (son of the previous)
  - To the Spanish

==== Tlachinollan, Yutandáyu ====
Tlachinollan was a late postclassic kingdom ruled by both Mixtecs and Tlapanec-Nahuas. Tlachinollan was the pre-Aztec name for Tlapa de Comonfort (known in Mixtec as Yutandáyu or Tinda'i), which would become the local garrison and tribute collection point after the Aztec conquest of the area in 1486.

Mixtec Lineage

- 1300-1307: ♂ Ten Deer
- 1307-1314: ♂ Nine Alligator
- 1314-1321: ♂ Four Eagle
- 1363-?: ♂ Two Water 'Arrow'
- 1363-1370: ♂ Four Alligator
- 1363-?: ♂ Six Death
- 1370-76: ♂ One Dog 'Serpent Decoration'
- 1510-1516: ♂ Two Deer

Tlapanec-Nahua Lineage

- 1300-1321: Lord Dead (Sun)
- 1321-1328: Lord House
- 1328-1335: Lord Tlaloc
- 1335-?: Lord Xipe
- 1335-?: Lord Shield
- 1342-1362: Lord Bird Alligator
- 1349-?: Lord Rabbit
- 1377-1383: Lord Cane Chilli
- 1384-1391: Lord Cane Alligator
- 1384-1391: Lord Night Obsidian
- 1391-1398: Lord Stone Flag
- 1391-1433: Lord Great Monkey
- 1398-1421: Lord Lizard
- 1421-1454: Flag of Quetzal Feathers
- 1440-?: Lord Deer Antlers (?)
- 1454-1477: Lord Tlaloc
- 1461-?: Lord Bee
- 1477-1496: Lord Turquoise Serpent
- 1496-1517: Lord Green Corn
- 1510-?: Lord Dog
- 1510-?: Lord Jaguar
- 1510-?: Lord Eagle
- 1517-1528: Lord Flames
- 1528-1533: Lord Rain on the Cultivated Field
- 1533-1538: Lord House
- 1538-1541: Lord Mace
- 1542-1561: Lord Jaguar
- 1545-1550: Lord Butterfly
- 1562-?: Lord Arrow

==== Tonalá, Ñuu Niñe ====
- ?: ♂ Eight Alligator 'Bird Claw'
- ?: ♂ Nine Wind 'Flint Serpent' (son of previous)
- ?: ♂ Four Movement 'Eagle' (son of previous)
- ?: ♂ Five Wind 'Celestial Rain' (son of previous)
- ?: ♀ Eight Deer 'Decorated Vest' (daughter of previous)
- ?: ♂ Five Dog 'Plumed Serpent' (possible son of previous)
- ?: ♂ (an unnamed brother of ♂ One Lizard, ruler of Cholula)
- ?: ♂ Eight Deer 'Plumed Serpent'
- ?: ♂ (an unnamed brother of ♀ Ten Reed, ruler of Tilantongo)

=== Toltec and Zapotec city-states closely-tied to the Mixtec ===
==== Tula-Cholula, Ñuu Cohyo, Tollan (Toltec) ====
- ?: ♂ One Lizard 'Serpent-Decorated Shield', and ♀ Eleven Serpent 'Jewel Mouth' (wife)
- c.1096: ♂ Four Jaguar 'Night Face'
- c.1115-?: ♂ Ten Movement 'Quetzal Owl' and ♀ Two Grass 'Sacred Jade' (siblings-spouses, children of Eight Deer, king of Tilantongo)
- ?: ♂ Eleven Lizard 'Fire Serpent'
- ?: ♂ Five Movement (brother-in-law of Six Lizard, king of Cuquila)
- ?: ♂ Eleven Vulture 'War Movement' (brother-in-law of Eleven Reed, king of Cuquila)

==== Coixtlahuaca, Yodzo Coo (Toltec) ====
- c.1096: ♂ Four Jaguar 'Night Face'
- c.1096-?: ♂ Seven Water (Atonal I)
- ?: ♂ Two Flower (grandson of previous)
- ?-1458: ♂ Six Water (Atonal II)

==== Cuautinchán, Huahiyaha (Toltec) ====
- ?: ♂ Eleven Serpent 'Jaguar Package Wrapping' (father-in-law of ♂ Nine Lizard, ruler of Jaltepec)

==== Cuyotepeji, Ñuu Ñaña (Toltec) ====
- ?: ♂ One Deer 'Serpent Earring' (father-in-law of Eight Deer, ruler of Tilantongo)
- c. 1521: ♂ Four Reed (baptized as Don Francisco de Mendoza; married to Ozomatzin of Camotlan and Doña Catalina Cuetzpalin)

==== Totomihuacan, Ñuu Dzaa (Toltec) ====
- ?: ♂ Five Eagle (son-in-law of ♂ One Lizard, king of Cholula; father-in-law of ♂ Eight Deer, king of Tilantongo)

==== Zaachila, Tocuisi (Zapotec) ====
Ruler	Born	Reign	Consort	Death	Notes
**Zaachila Zapotec dynasty/ Beni Zaa dynasty**
♂ Nine Serpent	?	?	♀ Eleven Rabbit 'Venus Quechquemitl' at least one child	?	
♂ Five Flower 'Xipe'	? Son of ♂ Nine Serpent and ♀ Eleven Rabbit	? – 1328	♀ Four Rabbit 'Quetzal' (of **Teozacoalco**); 1280 six children	1328; Zaachila	
♂ Three Alligator 'Smooth Eagle' (Ozomatli)	? Son of ♂ Five Flower and ♀ Four Rabbit	1328 – 1361	♀ Twelve Flint 'Staff of Respect' ♀ Ten House 'Jewel' five children in total	1361; Zaachila	
♂ Eleven Water 'Stone Rain' (Cosiioeza I, Huijatoo)	? Son of ♂ Three Alligator (Ozomatli)	1361 – 1386	♀ Eight Movement 'Fire Serpent' (of **Zaachila**) no children ♀ Thirteen Serpent 'Plumed Serpent'; Siyo 'Coo Yodzo' (of **Cacaxtli**) six children	1386; Zaachila	Siblings-spouses, ruled jointly.
♀ Eight Movement 'Fire Serpent'	? Daughter of ♂ Three Alligator (Ozomatli)	1361 – 1386	♂ Eleven Water 'Stone Rain' no children	c.1390? Zaachila	Siblings-spouses, ruled jointly.
♂ Six Water 'Cracked Boards' (Zaachila I)	c.1350 Son ♂ Eleven Water (Cosiioeza I) and ♀ Thirteen Serpent	1386 – 1415	♀ One Reed 'Sun Jewel' (of **Tlaxiaco**) one child	1415; Zaachila aged 64–65	
♂ Three Reed 'Smoked Eye' (Zaachila II)	? Son of ♂ Six Water and ♀ One Reed	1415 – 1454	Unmarried	1454; Zaachila	Left no descendants. He was succeeded by a cousin.
♂ Five Reed 'Twenty Jaguars' (Cosiiopii I); Zaachila III	1397; Son of ♂ Two Water, King of Teozacoalco and ♀ Three Alligator (of Zaachila)	1454 – 1487	Unmarried	1487; Zaachila aged 89–90	Left no descendants. He was succeeded by a nephew.
♂ Eight Deer 'Fire Serpent' (Cosiioeza II)	? Son of ♂ Five Rain, King of Teozacoalco and ♀ Five Flower (of Tlaxiaco)	1487 – 1504	♀ Xilabela (of the **Aztec Empire**); 1498 five children	1504; Zaachila	Nephew of the predecessor. Had a twin sister, Lady 8 Deer, who ascended to the throne of Tlaxiaco.
Regency of ♀ Xilabela (1504-1518)					Siblings, it's possible that they ruled jointly.
♂ ? Lizard (Cosiiopii II); **Juan Cortés Sicasibí**	30 December 1502; Guiengola; Son of ♂ Eight Deer (Cosiioeza II) and ♀ Xilabela	1504 – 1523	Tonaxiaba; **Magdalena del Espíritu Santo Zúñiga de los huaves** three children	1563; Guiengola aged 60–61	Siblings, it's possible that they ruled jointly.
♀ Twelve Grass (Pinopiia)	c.1500 Guiengola; Daughter of ♂ Eight Deer (Cosiioeza II) and ♀ Xilabela	1504 – 1520	?	c.1520 Guiengola aged 19-20	Siblings, it's possible that they ruled jointly.
Zaachila annexed to the Aztec Empire

== See also ==
- Mixtec
- Mixtec culture
- Mixtec language

== Bibliography ==
- Jansen, Maarten (1994), [Códice Egerton 2895] Códice Ñuu Ñaña. La gran familia de los reyes Mixtecos
- Jansen, Maarten; Pérez Jiménez, Gabina Aurora (2005). Codex Bodley: A Painted Chronicle from the Mixtec Highlands, Mexico. Bodleian Library. ISBN 9781851240951.
- Jansen, Maarten; Pérez Jiménez, Gabina Aurora (2011) [2010]. The Mixtec Pictorial Manuscripts - Time, Agency and Memory in Ancient Mexico. Brill. ISBN 978-90-04-19358-1.
- Terraciano, Kevin (2004). The Mixtecs of Colonial Oaxaca: Nudzahui History, Sixteenth Through Eighteenth Centuries. Stanford University Press. ISBN 978-0804751049.
