= Six Monkey War Quechquemitl =

11th-century Mixtec queen

♀ Six Monkey War Quechquemitl
- Iyadzehe (lady, queen)
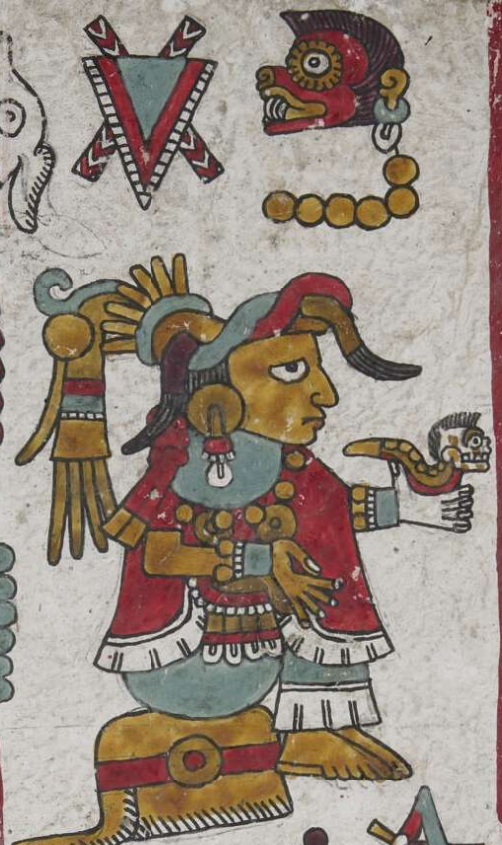
- Depiction of the ruler in the Codex Zouche-Nuttall

Queen of Jaltepec
- Reign: 1090 – 1101
- Predecessor: ♀ Nine Wind Stone Quechquemitl
- Successor: ♂ One Alligator Ballcourt Eagle

Queen consort of Huachino
- Tenure: 1089 – 1101
- Born: Before 1073; Jaltepec
- Died: 1101; Huachino
- Spouse: ♂ Eleven Wind Blood Jaguar (from Huachino)
- Issue: ♂ Four Wind Fire Serpent, King of Nuu Yuchi ♂ One Alligator Ballcourt Eagle, King of Jaltepec
- Mixtec: Ñuñuu 'Dzico Yecu'
- Father: ♂ Ten Eagle Stone Jaguar, King consort of Jaltepec
- Mother: ♀ Nine Wind Stone Quechquemitl, Queen regnant of Jaltepec

Six Monkey War Quechquemitl (Mixtec: Ñuñuu Dzico Yecu; born before 1073 – died 1101) was a queen of the Mixtec city-state of Huachino ("Red and White Bundle" or "Bundle of Xipe") from approximately 1089 to 1101 in present-day Mexico. She controlled Huachino as its co-ruler alongside her husband, Eleven Wind. ♀ Six Monkey was also the heir to the throne of the city state of Jaltepec ("Belching Mountain"), through her descent from queen regnant Nine Wind Stone Quechquemtil.

♀ Six Monkey's career is described in many contemporary documents, particularly the Codex Selden. She is best known for her conflict against ♂ Eight Deer Jaguar Claw, a struggle that John M. D. Pohl of the Fowler Museum has described as "an Iliad of the Mixtec people".

== Life ==
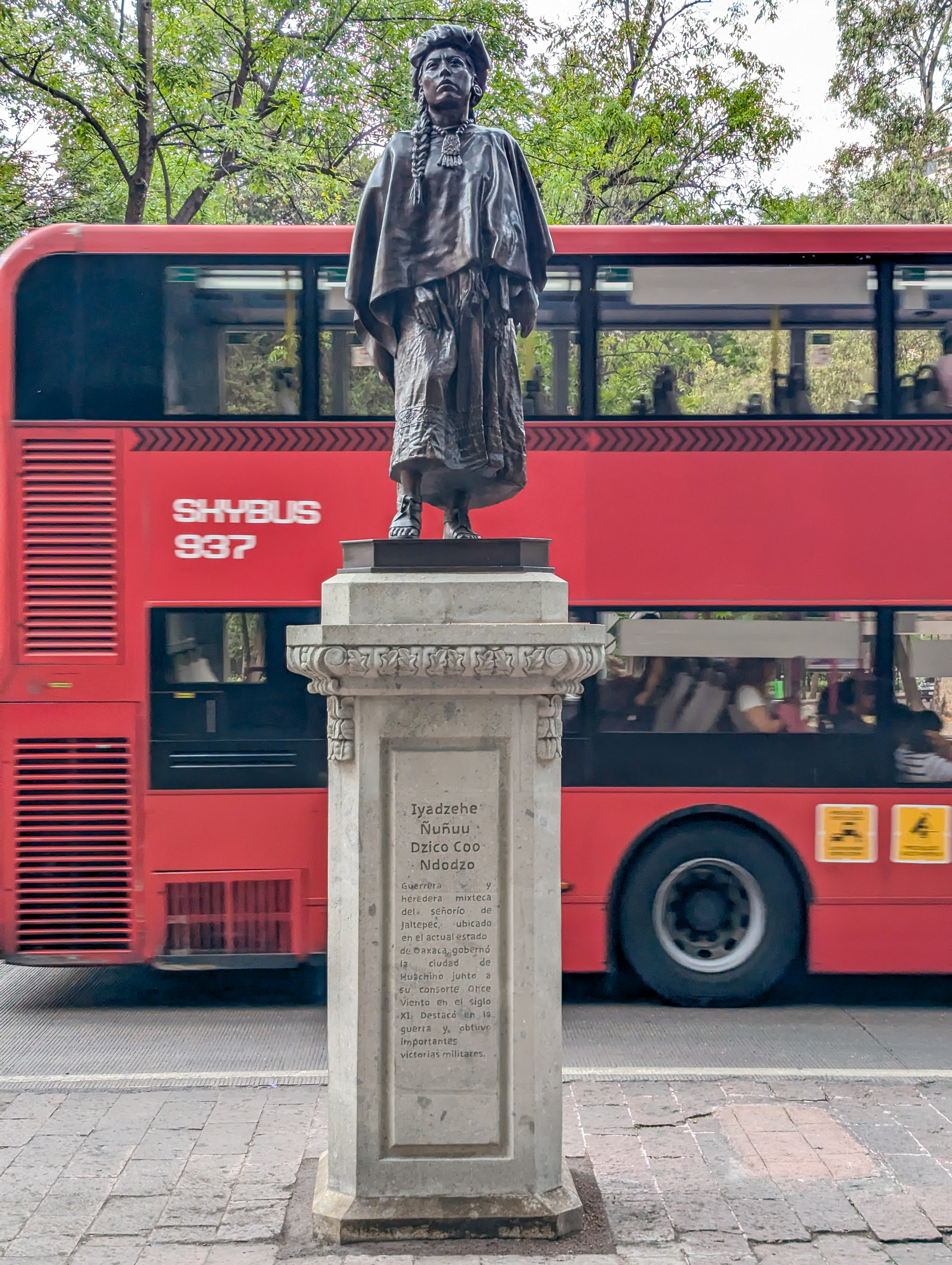
Sculpture of Iyadzehe Ñuñuu Dzico Coo Ndodzo on Paseo de la Reforma, Mexico City.

Six Monkey was born to ♀ Nine Wind and ♂ Ten Eagle, the rulers of Jaltepec, at some point before 1073. She was the oldest surviving child of the family; she had three older brothers, but according to the Codex Selden, all three were sacrificed at Chalcatongo after being defeated in battle. During her childhood, Six Monkey appears to have been tutored by a priest known as ♂ Ten Lizard. Codices also describe Six Monkey as traveling to a location called Skull Temple in 1083, where she consulted the oracle ♀ Nine Grass for advice.

Six Monkey married ♂ Eleven Wind, the ruler of Huachino, in 1089. She went on to have two children: ♂ Four Wind, born in 1092, and ♂ One Alligator, born in 1095. After her marriage, Six Monkey aimed to consolidate her power. During this period, Six Monkey's ambassadors were insulted by ♂ Six Lizard and ♂ Two Alligator, leading her to consult Nine Grass again for assistance and military support. Once Nine Grass' support was secured, Six Monkey defeated both lords in battle and burned their towns. Two Alligator was subsequently sacrificed at Jaltepec, while Six Lizard was sacrificed at Huachino. Six Monkey changed her sobriquet after this victory; previously nicknamed "Serpent Quechquemitl", she instead adopted the name "War Quechquemitl".

The most significant conflict of Six Monkey's reign was her war against Eight Deer Jaguar Claw. Jansen and Perez Jimenez argue that Eight Deer was seeking to stamp out the descendants of his father's first wife; these descendants included Six Monkey's husband, Eleven Wind, thus entangling her in the conflict. During this war, Eight Deer conquered Huachino in approximately 1101, and sacrificed both Eleven Wind and Six Monkey in the aftermath of his victory. Some contemporary documents about Six Monkey's reign, such as the Codex Selden and Codex Añute, omit mention of her downfall and death.

Six Monkey's eldest son, Four Wind, survived the conquest of Huachino. Four Wind would later go on to marry Eight Deer's daughter, Ten Flower, a marriage that was notable for uniting the royal dynasties of Jaltepec, Huachino, and Tilantongo. Four Wind also went on to orchestrate the assassination of Eight Deer in 1115. The strife between the families of Six Monkey and Eight Deer was reported in multiple codices, suggesting that Six Monkey's rise and fall was a well-known narrative in the region.

== Bibliography ==
- Jansen, Maarten; Lladó-Buisán, Virginia M.; Snijders, Ludo, eds. (2019). Mesoamerican Manuscripts: New Scientific Approaches and Interpretations. Leiden: Brill.
- Williams, Robert Lloyd (2009). Lord Eight Wind of Suchixtlan and the Heroes of Ancient Oaxaca: Reading History in the Codex Zouche-Nuttall. Austin: University of Texas Press.

Preceded by Nine Wind 'Stone Quechquemitl'	Iyadzehe ('Queen') of Jaltepec; 1090-1101	Succeeded by One Alligator 'Ballcourt Eagle'
