= Eight Deer Jaguar Claw =

Mixtec conqueror

♂ Eight Deer Jaguar Claw
- Iya (lord, king)
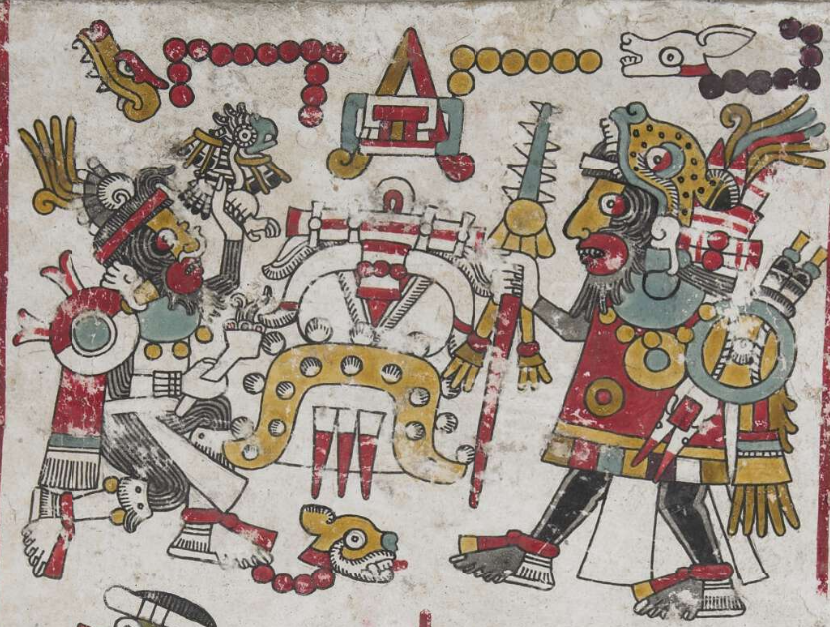
- ♂ Eight Deer Jaguar Claw (right) meeting with Toltec ruler ♂ Four Jaguar, in a depiction from the Codex Zouche-Nuttall. His name glyph, a deer head and eight dots, is above his head.

King of Tututepec (Yucu Dzaa)
- Reign: 1084 – 10 November 1115
- Successor: ♂ Four Wind Fire Serpent

King of Tilantongo (Ñuu Tnoo)
- Reign: 18 June 1097 – 10 November 1115
- Successor: ♂ Six House Jaguar that Came from the Sky (at Tilantongo) ♂ Four Dog Coyote Hunter (at Teozacoalco)
- Born: 5 October 1063; Tilantongo
- Died: 10 November 1115 (aged 52); Tilantongo
- Spouse: See list: ♀ Thirteen Serpent Flowered Serpent (from Red and White Bundle); ♀ Six Eagle Spiderweb Jaguar (from Chalcatongo); ♀ Ten Vulture Brilliant Quechquemitl (from Tilantongo); ♀ Eleven Serpent Jaguar Flower Turquoise Teeth (from Cholula); ♀ Six Wind (from Cuyotepeji)
- Issue more...: ♂ Six House Jaguar that Came from the Sky, King of Tilantongo; ♂ Four Dog Coyote Hunter, King of Teozacoalco; ♀ Ten Flower Rain Spiderweb, Queen of Nuu Yuchi; ♀ Six Wind Quetzal Feather of Royal Blood, Queen of Jaltepec; ♀ Six Flint Precious Fire Serpent, Queen of Jaltepec; ♀ Five Wind Fur and Jade Ornament, Queen of Nuu Yuchi
Names
- Nacuaa 'Teyusi Ñaña'
- Father: ♂ Five Alligator Sun Rain, High Priest of Tilantongo
- Mother: ♀ Eleven Water Bird Jewel
- Religion: Mixtec religion

Eight Deer Jaguar Claw (Mixtec: Iya Nacuaa Teyusi Ñaña), or Eight Deer for brevity, (5 October 1063 - 1115) was a powerful Mixtec ruler in 11th-century Oaxaca referred to in the 15th-century deerskin manuscript Codex Zouche-Nuttall, and other Mixtec manuscripts. His surname is alternatively translated Tiger-Claw and Ocelot-Claw.

== Biography ==
Born on the Mixtec Calendar date from which he got his name, Eight Deer was the son of the high priest of Tilantongo ♂ Five Alligator Sun Rain and ♀ Eleven Water Bird Jewel. Two of his brothers, Twelve Earthquake Bloody Jaguar and Nine Flower Copal Ball with Arrow, were his faithful war companions.

He also had a half-sister, Six Lizard Jade Fan. First the fiancée and lover of Eight Deer himself, she was ultimately married to Eight Deer's archenemy Eleven Wind Bloody Jaguar, the king of the city Xipe's Bundle, also known as Red and White Bundle. The lords of Xipe's Bundle had rights to the throne of Tilantongo and were therefore the most important rivals to Eight Deer's power.

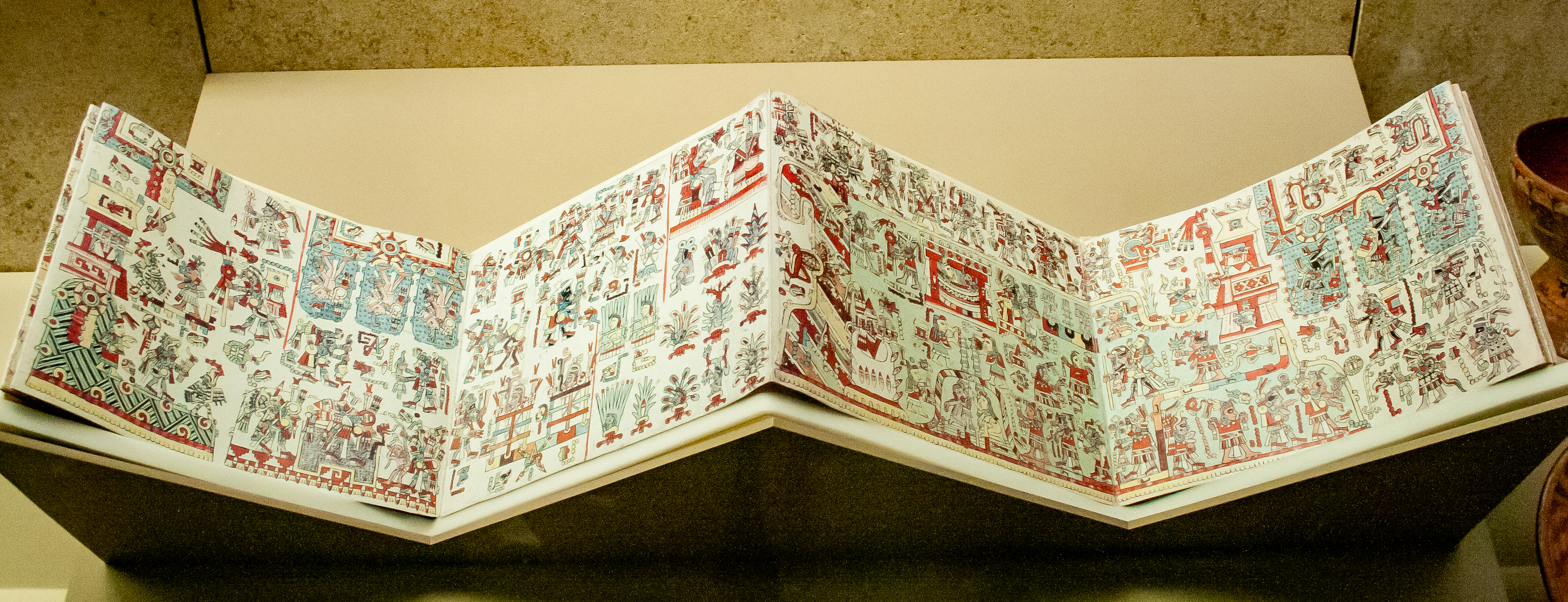
Codex Zouche-Nuttall, Mixtec pictorial codex, which is the main source of knowledge about Eight Deer Jaguar Claw

♂ Eight Deer is remembered for his military expansion. The Codex Zouche-Nuttall counts 94 cities conquered during his reign. Almost always pictured wearing a jaguar helmet, he supported the powerful Toltec ruler of Cholula, ♂ Four Jaguar Face of the Night, in his attempts at expansionism, and was thus awarded a turquoise nose ornament, a symbol of Toltec royal authority. Maarten Jansen identifies Four Jaguar with Ce Acatl Topiltzin.

The codices also tell of his several marriages which seem to have been part of a political strategy to achieve dominance by marrying into different Mixtec royal lineages. He married Thirteen Serpent, daughter of his own stepsister and former fiancée Six Lizard.

In 1101 Eight Deer conquered Xipe's Bundle and killed his wife's father and his stepsister's husband Eleven Wind. He also tortured and killed his brothers-in-law, sparing only the youngest, Four Wind. Eight Deer's own death is described differently by modern authors. Charles C. Mann's book 1491 states that when Eight Deer was 55 years of age, Four Wind led an alliance between different Toltec and Zapotec kingdoms against Eight Deer, who was taken prisoner and sacrificed by Four Wind, his own nephew and brother-in-law. Pohl instead states that Four Wind was trusted by Eight Deer and raised as his own child, until at the age of 23 he had Eight Deer assassinated during a hunting trip.

== Legacy ==
Eight Deer was the only Mixtec king to unite kingdoms of the three Mixtec areas: Tilantongo in the Mixteca Alta area, Teozacoalco of the Mixteca Baja area, and Tututepec of the coastal Mixteca area.

His reputation as a great ruler has given him a legendary status among the Mixtecs; some aspects of his life story as told in the pictographic codices seem to merge with myth. Furthermore, actual knowledge of his life is hindered by the lack of complete understanding of the Mixtec codices, and although the study of the codices has advanced much over the past 20 years, it is still difficult to achieve a definitive interpretation of their narrative. The narrative, as it is currently understood, is a tragic story of a man who achieves greatness but falls victim to his own hunger for power. The above biography of Eight Deer is based on the codex's interpretation by Mixtec specialist John Pohl.

== Family ==
Eight Deer married firstly, in 1103, his niece Thirteen Serpent Flowered Serpent, daughter of Eleven Wind Bloody Jaguar (1027-1099), king of Red and White Bundle, and his first wife Six Lizard Jade Fan (1047-1090), who was also Eight Deer's half-sister and lover. The couple had the following children:

- ♂ Four Dog Coyote Hunter (1110-c.1150), the official first-born of Eight Deer, actually his second-born. Inherited the realm of Teozacoalco.
- ♀ Ten Flower Rain Spiderweb, (born 1110), married, in 1124, Four Wind Fire Serpent, her father's killer. Through this marriage, she legitimised Four Wind's occupation of Eight Deer's coastal realm of Tututepec.
- ♂ Four Alligator Sacred Serpent (born 1112)
- ♀ Six Wind Quetzal Feather of Royal Blood, Queen of Jaltepec by marriage with its king, One Alligator Field Eagle, in 1122.
- ♀ Six Flint Precious Fire Serpent, Queen of Jaltepec by marriage with its king, One Alligator Field Eagle, in 1122.

In 1105, Eight Deer married his other niece Six Eagle Spiderweb Jaguar, daughter of Eight Aligator Bloody Coyote, king of Chalcatongo, and Eight Deer's full sister Nine Monkey Quetzal Jewel. Together they had:

- ♂ Six House Jaguar that Came from the Sky (1109-c.1150), the first-born of Eight-Deer. His birth had to be announced a year later, so Eight Deer's main wife, Thirteen Serpent, could give birth to the official first-born of the ruler. Inherited the main realm of Tilantongo.

In the same year, Eight Deer married one of the heiresses of Tilantongo, Ten Vulture Brilliant Quechquemitl, who was a daughter of Thirteen Death, king of Teita and Seven Reed Flower Jewel, sister of Twelve Lizard Arrow Feet, king of Tilantongo. The couple had:

- ♀ Five Wind Fur and Jade Ornament (born 1111), married, in 1125, Four Wind Fire Serpent, her father's killer. Through this marriage, she legitimised Four Wind's occupation of Eight Deer's coastal realm of Tututepec.
- ♂ Twelve Dog Knife

Still in 1105, married again to Eleven Serpent Jaguar Flower Turquoise Teeth, daughter of Five Eagle, king of Totomihuacan, and Nine Serpent, from Cholula. They had the following children:

- ♀ Two Grass Sacred Jade, king of Tollan (?), married her full-brother.
- ♂ Ten Movement Quetzal Owl, queen of Tollan (?), married his full-sister.

Finally, he married a fifth time with Six Wind Big Plumes of Noble Blood, daughter of One Deer Serpent Earring, king of Cuyotepeji. They had no children. She went on to marry Five Dog Coyote, brother of the king of Cuquila.

== Notes ==
Preceded by Twelve Lizard 'Arrow Feet' or Two Rain 'Twenty Jaguars' (Disputed)	Iya ('King') of Tilantongo; 1097-1115	Succeeded by Six House 'Jaguar Falling from Heaven' (at Tilantongo); Four Dog 'Coyote Catcher' (at Teozacoalco)
Preceded by Unknown	Iya ('King') of Tututepec; 1084-1115	Succeeded by Four Wind 'Fire Serpent'
