= Tequixtepec =

Tequixtepec may refer to:

- San Miguel Tequixtepec, Oaxaca
- San Pedro y San Pablo Tequixtepec, Oaxaca
