= Codex Waecker-Gotter =

Mexican indigenous manuscript

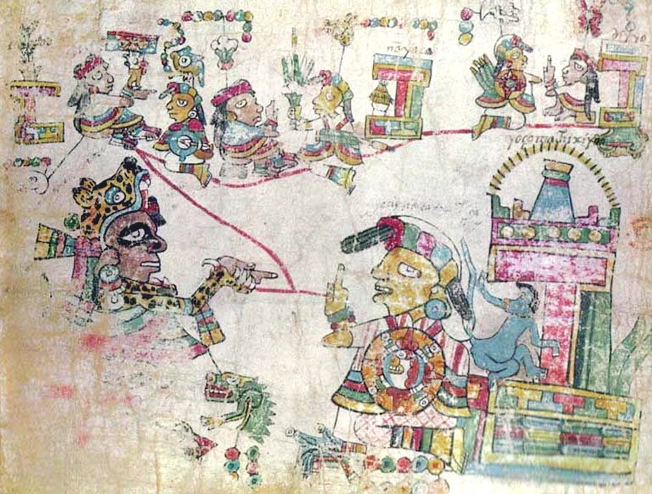
- Page from the codex as displayed in the British Museum
- Material: Animal skin
- Size: 4.42 metres (14.5 ft) in length
- Created: 16th–18th centuries AD
- Present location: British Museum, London
- Registration: Am1962,03.8 (Códice Sánchez Solís / Codex Egerton 2895 / Codex Waecker-Gotter / Códice Zapoteco)

The Codex Waecker-Gotter, also known as the Code Sanchez-Solís or Codex Egerton, is a Pre-Conquest-style manuscript from Mexico that has been in the British Museum's collection since 1911 (reference number Am1962,03.8).

== Description ==
The codex is made of animal skin and consists of 16 leaves, each measuring approximately 27 x 21 cm; the total length of the manuscript is 4.42 m. Both sides of the codex are painted, but over time the condition of the paint has deteriorated, and one page seems to have been deliberately effaced, perhaps by a colonial official, as it bears a Spanish stamp.

The manuscript was probably first drawn in the 16th century, with later additions made in the 17th or 18th century. Most experts consider the style of the artwork to be Mixtec with some Aztec elements.

== Content ==
The document is an important witness to the transition between Pre-Columbian times and the early colonial period in Mexico. It describes a genealogy that comprises 26 different generations that have been estimated to have lived between 970 and 1490 AD; the men are shown wearing masks and crowns while the women are in generally depicted in a kneeling position. On one page the town of Cuquila Santa Maria in Tlaxiaco is illustrated, along with its first king 'Lord One Alligator Tlaloc' and his wife 'One Alligator Sun', who may have been the founding member of the dynasty.

== Provenance ==
The manuscript was probably made over a period of time by different hands in the Mixteca Baja region. In 1869, it came into the possession of Felipe Sanchez Solis who sold it to Freiherr von Waecker-Gotter, a member of the German diplomatic corps in Mexico between 1880 and 1888. It was bought by the British Museum in 1911 from funds bequeathed by France Henry Egerton.

== See also ==
- Codex Zouche-Nuttall, also in the British Museum

== Bibliography ==
- U Berger, 'Mexican painted Manuscripts in the United Kingdom', British Museum Occasional Paper, Number 91, 1998
- G. Brotherstone, Painted books of Mexico (London, The British Museum Press, 1995)
- C. McEwan, Ancient Mexico in the British (London, The British Museum Press, 1994)
