= Santo Domingo Yanhuitlán =

- Location within Mexico
- Coordinates: 17°31′N 97°20′W
- Country: Mexico
- State: Oaxaca
- Municipality: Santo Domingo Yanhuitlán
- Time zone: UTC-6 (Central (US Central))

Santo Domingo Yanhuitlán is a village and municipality in the state of Oaxaca, Mexico, located northwest of Oaxaca city. It is part of the Nochixtlán District in the southeast of the Mixteca Region. It is 2,140 meters above sea level. Its name comes from the patron saint of the town (Saint Dominic), and Yanhuitlan is from Náhuatl Yancuitlan meaning “near something new”.

== The town ==
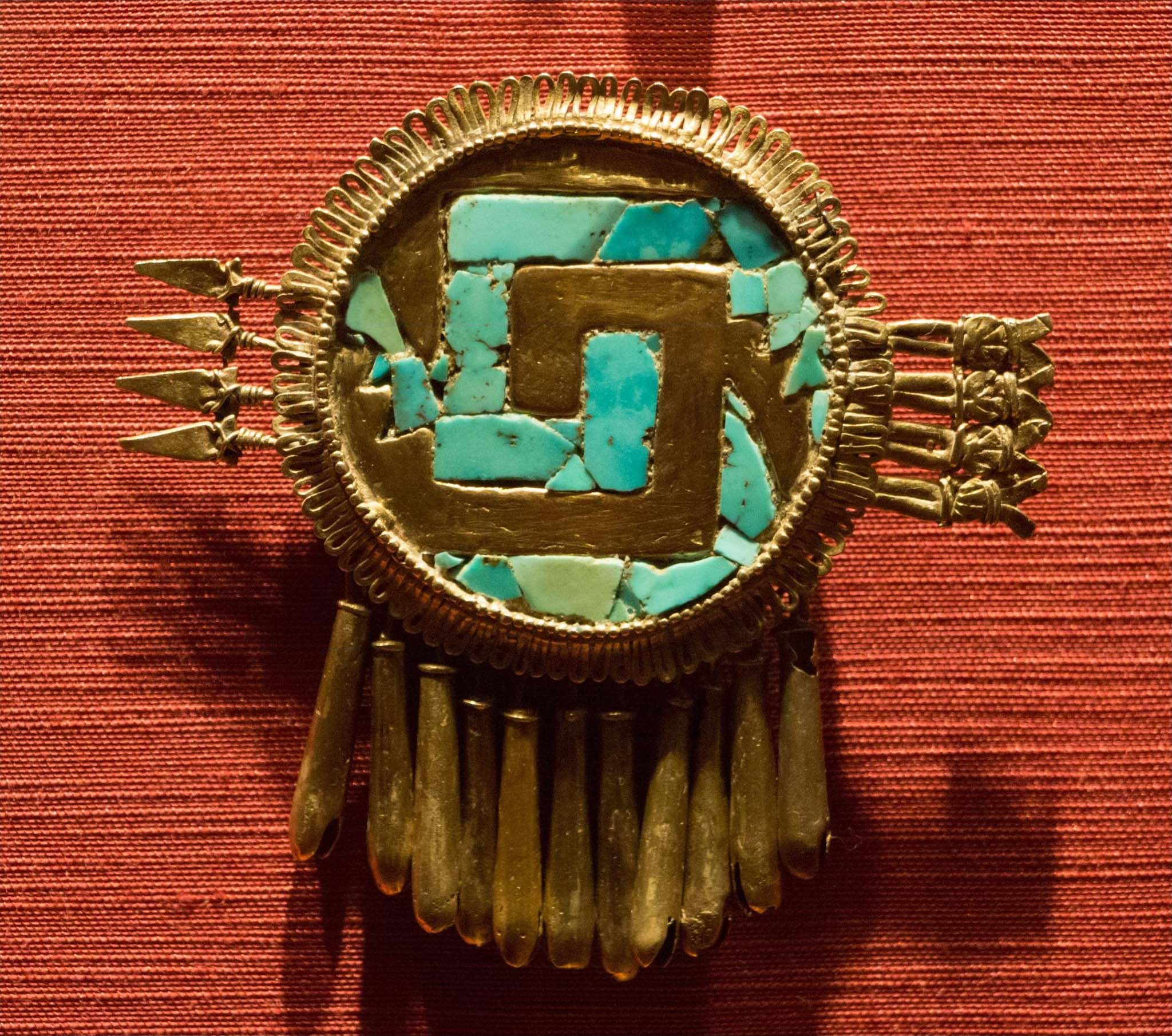
Shield of Yanhuitlan in the National Museum of Anthropology in Mexico City

Before the Spanish conquest, Yanhuitlán (known in Mixtec as Yodzocahi) was a Mixtec ñuu (city-state). The Danza de los Voladores and ingestion of Psilocybin mushrooms were practiced here. It was conquered by Tizoc, but in 1506 rebelled along with Sosollan, probably by expelling or killing Mexica pochteca. In response, Moctezuma II sacked the town and took approximately 1000 prisoners to Tenochtitlan, who were later sacrificed in the Tlacaxipehualiztli festival.

After the fall of Tenōchtitlan in 1521, many city-states such as Yanhuitlán, acquired new degrees of sovereignty from the Aztec empire. Local leaders in Yanhuitlán opposed the arrival of Christian missionaries. The town was founded by Dominican friars 10 years after the Spanish came to Oaxaca. Historically, in colonial times, Yanhuitlán was an important commercial center of the Mixtec people, exporting silk to Mexico City, Puebla and Oaxaca city. Communal earnings are kept in chests locked with three keys to conserve them for the cultural development of each of the seven “neighborhoods” of Yanahuitlán: Ayuxu Dana, Xayujo, Tico, Tinde, Yudayo. Yuxacoyo y Yuyuxa.

The municipality is dominated by the Templo y Ex-convento de Santo Domingo (Temple and former convent of Saint Dominic), built around the middle of the 16th century on pre-Hispanic foundations. It has a notable façade, baptismal font, “sotocoro” roof, a large number of fine colonial-era santos (statues of the saints) various altarpieces (retablos) on the sides of the church as well as a main altarpiece constructed like a folding screen. It also contains an antique pipe organ built around 1700 and restored to playing condition by Pascal Quoirin in 1998.

== The codex ==
The codex was written by its inhabitants around 1550, made on European paper, dated 1550 to 1570, to celebrate the agreement between chiefs, religious and encomendero, the document also intended to take stock of what had in taxes and tequitl work or the community to their new rulers. It is currently in the special collections of the José María Lafragua Historical Library of the Autonomous University of Puebla.

== The municipality ==
As municipal seat, Yanhuitlán has governing jurisdiction over the following communities:

Barrio de los Arcos, Caja de Agua, El Jazmín, La Cantera, La Cieneguilla, La Laguna, Los Dos Corazones, Rancho Celerino, vendaño, Río Grande, San Sebastián (Primera Sección), Tijua, Tooxi, Xaacahua, Xacañi, Xahayucuanino, Yucudahuico, Yudayo, and Yuxaxiño
