= Santa María Zacatepec =

- Municipality and town
- Interactive map of Santa María Zacatepec
- Coordinates: 16°45′N 97°59′W
- Country: Mexico
- State: Oaxaca

Population (2020)
  - Total: 5,961
- Time zone: UTC-6 (Central Standard Time)

Santa María Zacatepec is a town and municipality in Oaxaca in south-western Mexico. The municipality covers an area of km^{2}. It is part of Putla District in the west of the Costa de Oaxaca.

As of 2020, the municipality had a total population of 5,961.

== History ==
Zacatepec, meaning "grassy hill" in Nahuatl and called Yucu Satuta or Yucu Chatuta in Mixtec, was a prehispanic city-state inhabited by both Amuzgos and Mixtecs/Tacuates, which maintained independence from both Tututepec and the Aztec Empire. The people worshipped two stone idols called Yahatujyuty and Ñañahuconuhu. The cacique was responsible for selecting priests according to merit. They could come from either a noble or commoner background, advised the cacique on all matters, served for fifteen to twenty years and were required to maintain chastity and abstinence on penalty of death by stoning. Before feasts, priests had to fast for five or six days, eating nothing and inhaling tobacco smoke. Adultery and theft were punished by the cacique confiscating the possessions of the guilty and enslaving them. The cacique had complete control over the community and received mantles, jewels and green stones in tribute. He was allowed to take multiple wives, but could only be legitimately succeeded by the child of his first wife. Before the Spanish conquest, the cacique of Zacatepec was named Yyachihuyzu (Mixtec for "Lord Wind Jaguar").
