= Red and White Bundle =

Location that is mentioned in several of the Mesoamerican codices

"Red and White Bundle" is the nickname given to a location that is mentioned in several of the Mesoamerican codices which provide historico-mythical accounts of events and genealogies of the pre-Columbian Mixtec civilization, which was centered on the Oaxacan region of central-southern Mexico. The original Mixtec name of this location is unknown. Its reference by Mesoamerica scholars as 'Red and White Bundle' derives from the appearance of the toponymic glyph associated with it in the pictorial Mixtec codices, such as the Zouche-Nuttall, Bodley and Vindobonensis codices.

It was conquered by Eight Deer Jaguar Claw around 1099 and was the home city of Four Wind.
