= San Pedro Topiltepec =

- Municipality and town
- Location in Mexico
- Coordinates: 17°26′N 97°21′W
- Country: Mexico
- State: Oaxaca
- District: Teposcolula District

Area
  - Total: 45.93 km^{2} (17.73 sq mi)
- Elevation: 2,170 m (7,120 ft)
- Time zone: UTC-6 (Central Standard Time)

San Pedro Topiltepec is a town and municipality in Oaxaca in south-western Mexico. It is part of the Teposcolula District in the center of the Mixteca Region. The name "Topiltepec" means "The Sheriff Hill".

== Geography ==
The municipality covers an area of 45.93 km^{2} at an altitude of 2,170 meters above sea level. The climate is mild with little variation during the year. Flora includes roses, geraniums, lilies, regina, bougainvillea and jasmine flowers, and oak, pine, juniper, ramonal, ash and arbutus trees.

== Population ==
As of 2005, the municipality had 109 households with a total population of 372 of whom two spoke an indigenous language. Most of the people are devoted to agriculture, planting of corn, beans and wheat. A small proportion of the population is engaged in raising beef cattle and pigs.
