= Soyaltepec =

Soyaltepec may refer to:

- San Bartolo Soyaltepec, Oaxaca
- San Miguel Soyaltepec, Oaxaca
- Soyaltepec Mixtec language
- Soyaltepec Mazatec language
