= Zapotitlán =

Zapotitlán is a word of Nahuatl origin meaning "Place of the sapodilla". It may refer to:

== Places ==
Guatemala

- Zapotitlán, Jutiapa
- San Francisco Zapotitlán, Suchitepéquez
- San Martín Zapotitlán, Retalhuleu

Mexico

- Zapotitlán Tablas, Guerrero
- Zapotitlán de Vadillo, Jalisco
- Zapotitlán del Río, Oaxaca
- Zapotitlán Lagunas, Oaxaca
- Zapotitlán Palmas, Oaxaca
- Zapotitlán, Puebla
- Zapotitlán de Méndez, Puebla

== Other ==
- Zapotitlán metro station, station of the Mexico City Metro
