= Zahuatlán =

Zahuatlán may refer to:

- Magdalena Zahuatlán
- San Simón Zahuatlán
