= San Pedro Teozacoalco =

- Municipality and town
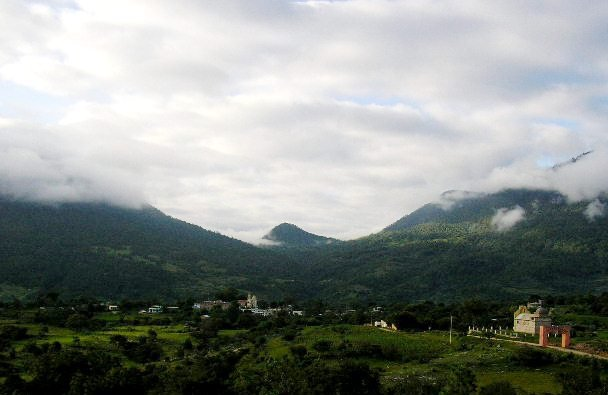

- Location in Mexico
- Coordinates: 17°01′01″N 97°17′12″W
- Country: Mexico
- State: Oaxaca
- Time zone: UTC-6 (Central Standard Time)

San Pedro Teozacoalco (Mixtec: Chiyocanu, 'Great Altar') is a town and municipality in Oaxaca, in south-western Mexico. It is part of the Nochixtlán District in the southeast of the Mixteca Region.

== Population ==
As of 2005, the municipality had a total population of 1,298, of which only 13 spoke a native language other than Spanish.

== History ==
Before Spanish colonization, Teozacoalco was a notable city-state of the Mixtec culture, often associated politically with nearby Tilantongo. It was conquered by Moctezuma II, thereafter becoming the capital of a strategic province which stretched to the southwest as far as Zenzontepec. It paid tribute of greenstone, feathers and mantas. It was home to an Aztec garrison, for which it provided maize, beans, chia and cotton.
