= Asunción Cuyotepeji =

- Municipality and town
- Location in Mexico
- Coordinates: 17°55′49″N 97°40′24″W
- Country: Mexico
- State: Oaxaca

Area
  - Total: 547.33 km^{2} (211.33 sq mi)

Population (2005)
  - Total: 14,438
- Time zone: UTC-6 (Central Standard Time)

Asunción Cuyotepeji is a town and municipality in Oaxaca in south-western Mexico. The municipality covers an area of 547.33 km^{2}. It is part of the Huajuapan District in the north of the Mixteca Region, which forms the northwest portion of the state of Oaxaca. As of 2005, the municipality had a total population of 14,438. It is 1760 meters above the sea level. Its territory is delimited by other small municipalities. At the north it is limited by Santiago Miltepec and San Juan Bautista Suchitepec municipalities; in south by Santa Maria Camotlan; at the east by Santa Catarina Zapoquila and Santiago Thuitlan Plumas; finally at the west it is delimited by Ciudad de Huajuapan de leon and Santiago Miltepec.

== History ==
There is no reliable history on where the original settlers of this area came from. According to the National Archive, a royal grant was issued to Martin Enriquez Visorrey in 1578 to establish the Spanish settlement. In 1704, this land was given to an indigenous chieftain. In 1785, the lands passed into the hands of Gregorio Villagomez. Finally, because of a viceregal decision, the lands were given to the family of Mariano Francisco which settled here and founded the modern town.

During the Spanish domination and even after Mexican Independence, the chieftains and their descendants had power over all the inhabitants of the town. After some years of being exploited by the chieftains the inhabitants fought for their rights, obtaining a kind of agreement in which they established that the inhabitants could own and use the lands for their own benefit by only paying a very small amount of money. As a consequence a great majority of the inhabitants owned most of the town, ending the conflicts between the chieftains and the inhabitants of the town.

== Economy ==
60 per cent of the people in this area work in agricultural fields. The principal crops produced are beans, chili peppers, and amaranth. Another 30 per cent of the population works with handling livestock, the main livestock being pigs, cattle, and goats. The remaining 10 per cent works in local trades.

== Cultural and tourist attractions ==
This Oaxacan Municipality does not have great historic monuments, but it does have a small archeological area. Approximately 1 kilometer from the east part of the town, it is located in the Cerro Del Mosquito, an uninhabited area in which there has been found many prehistoric artifacts such as pottery, carved stones, and jade. It has a large scale festival every year on August 14 through to August 16known as the Fiesta Patronal. These events are organized by inhabitants of the town with regard to their religious idol. In this case the festivity is with regard to "Santa Maria Asuncion". Usually this kind of events involved a great variety of activities such as sports, folkloric dances, and fireworks. Every neighborhood of the town has its own religious idol, so when is time to prepare the festivity, a different person is chosen every year to organize the event. In Mexico, on November 2 it is a tradition to celebrate the Day of the Dead, known as "Dia de los Muertos" in which every family honors their dead relatives. In Cacalotepec every family visits their relatives graves and then prepare an ofrenda in which they offer to their loved ones a variety of traditional foods such as mole, tamales, mescal, chocolate, and bread, according to what the dead ancestor enjoyed while they were living.
