= San Jerónimo Sosola =

- Municipality and town
- Location in Mexico
- Coordinates: 17°22′N 97°02′W
- Country: Mexico
- State: Oaxaca

Area
  - Total: 140.34 km^{2} (54.19 sq mi)

Population (2005)
  - Total: 2,736
- Time zone: UTC-6 (Central Standard Time)

San Jerónimo Sosola is a town and municipality in Oaxaca in south-western Mexico. The municipality covers an area of 140.34 km^{2}. It is part of the Etla District in the Valles Centrales region.

As of 2005, the municipality had a total population of 2,736.
