= Codex Zouche-Nuttall =

Pre-Columbian document of Mixtec pictography

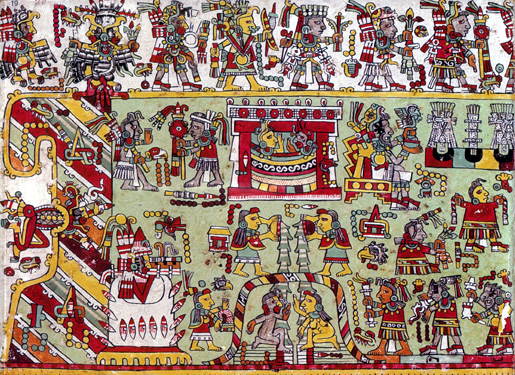
- Detail of page 20 from the codex
- Material: Animal skin
- Size: 11.35 metres (37.2 ft) in length
- Created: 14th–15th centuries AD
- Present location: British Museum, London
- Registration: Add MS 39671

The Codex Zouche-Nuttall or Codex Tonindeye is an accordion-folded pre-Columbian document of Mixtec pictography, now in the collections of the British Museum. It is one of about 16 manuscripts from Mexico that are entirely pre-Columbian in origin. The codex derives its name from Zelia Nuttall, who first published it in 1902, and Robert Curzon, 14th Baron Zouche (1810–1873), whose collection was donated to the British Museum upon the death of his daughter, Darea Curzon, 16th Baroness Zouche, in 1917.

== Description ==
The Codex Zouche-Nuttall was probably made in the 14th century and is composed of 47 sections of animal skin with dimensions of 19 cm by 23.5 cm. The codex folds together like a screen and is vividly painted on both sides, and the condition of the document is by and large excellent. It is one of three codices that record the genealogies, alliances and conquests of several 11th- and 12th-century rulers of a small Mixtec city-state in highland Oaxaca, the Tilantongo kingdom, especially under the leadership of the warrior Lord Eight Deer Jaguar Claw (who died in the early 12th century at the age of 52).

== Provenance ==
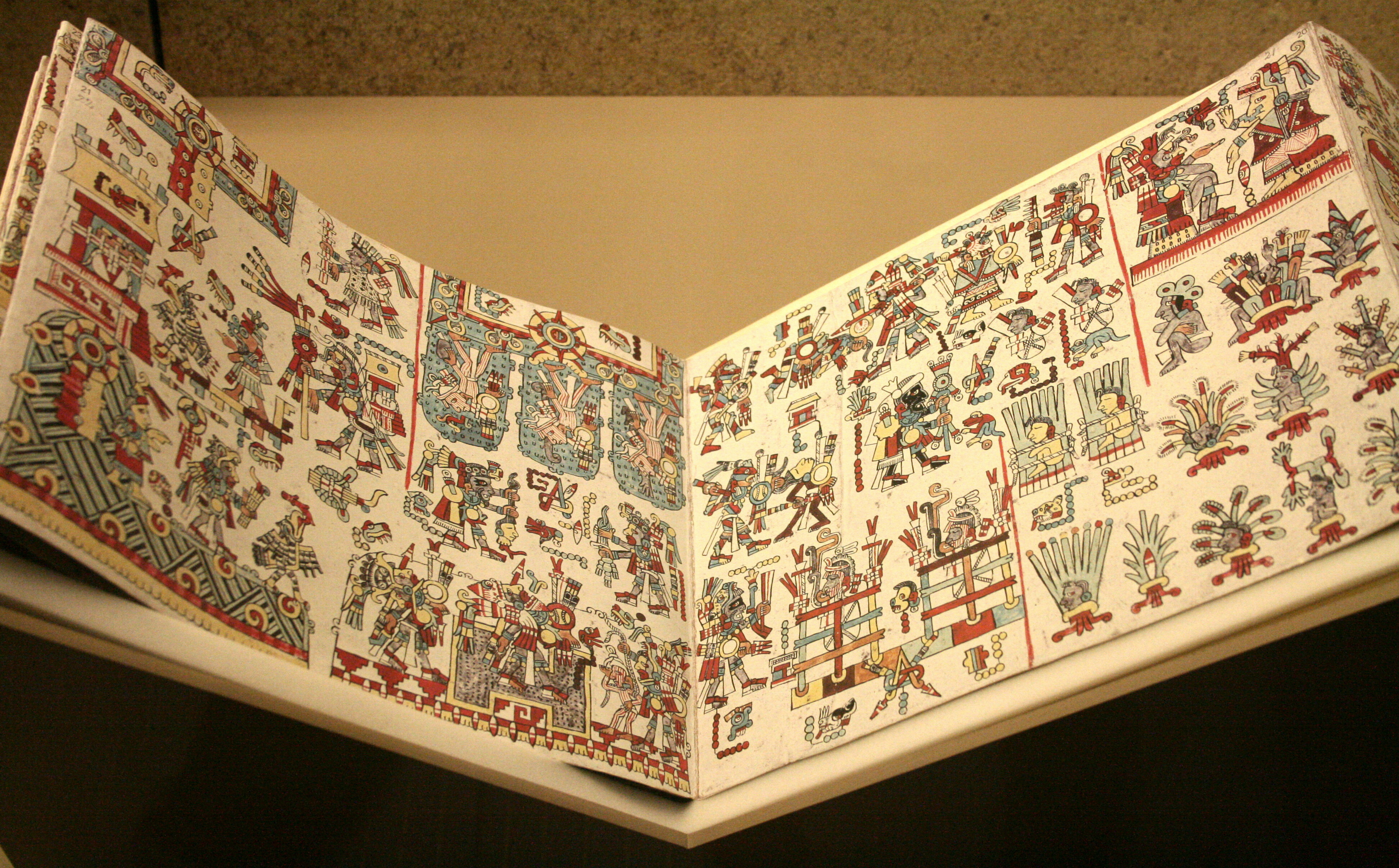
Two pages of the Codex Zouche-Nuttall, as displayed at the British Museum in 2008

The codex probably reached Spain in the 16th century. It was first identified at the Monastery of San Marco, Florence, in 1854 and was sold in 1859 to John Temple Leader, who sent it to his friend Robert Curzon, 14th Baron Zouche. A facsimile was published while it was in the collection of Baron Zouche by the Peabody Museum of Archaeology and Ethnology, Harvard in 1902, with an introduction by Zelia Nuttall (1857–1933). The British Museum was loaned the manuscript in 1876 and acquired it in 1917.

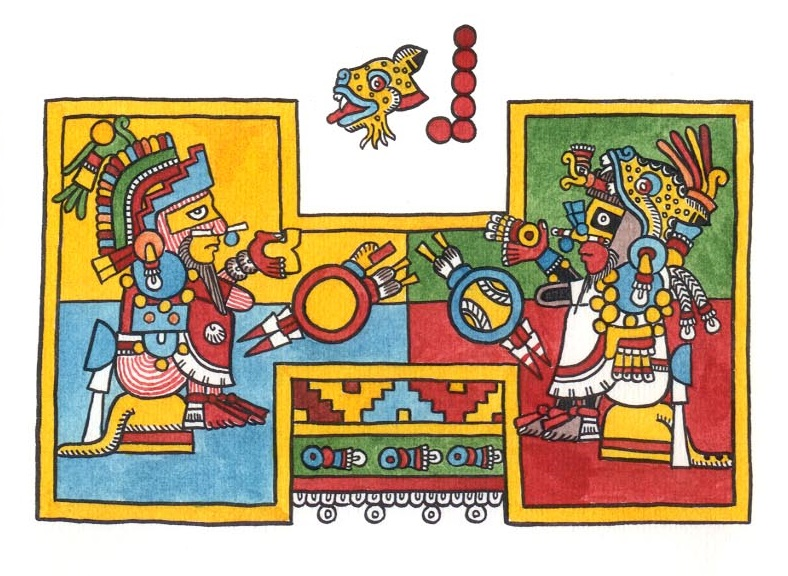
Ballcourt in the Codex Nuttall. Drawing by Lacambalam.

== See also ==
- Codex Waecker-Gotter, in the British Museum

== Bibliography ==
- E.H. Boone, Stories in red and black: pict (Austin, University of Texas Press, 2000)
- Nuttall, Zelia (1902). Codex Nuttall; facsimile of an ancient Mexican codex belonging to Lord Zouche of Harynworth, England. Cambridge, Massachusetts: Peabody Museum of American Archaeology and Ethnology.
- G. Brotherstone, Painted books of Mexico (London, The British Museum Press, 1995)
- C. McEwan, Ancient Mexico in the British (London, The British Museum Press, 1994)
- F. Anders, M. Jansen and G. A. Pérez Jiménez, Códice Zouche-Nuttall, facsimile with commentary and line drawing (Madrid, Sociedad Estatal Quinto Centenario; Graz, Akademische Druck-u. Verlagsanstalt; Mexico City, Fondo de Cultura Económica, 1992) Online pdf copy.
- Fewkes, J. Walter (April–June 1902). "Codex Nuttall. Facsimile of an Ancient Mexican Codex Belonging to Lord Zouche of Harynworth, England". American Anthropologist. New Series. 4 (2): 298–301. doi:10.1525/aa.1902.4.2.02a00100.
- Tozzer, Alfred M. (July–September 1933). "Zelia Nuttall" (PDF). American Anthropologist. New Series. 35 (3): 475–482. doi:10.1525/aa.1933.35.3.02a00070. Archived from the original (PDF) on 2008-10-31.
- Facsimile: Codex Zouche-Nuttall; London, British Library, Add MS 39671, Akademische Druck- u. Verlagsanstalt (ADEVA) Graz 1987. Complete colour facsimile edition of the Mixtec pictorial manuscript in the possession of British Library, London, 96 fol., size: 245 x 191 mm, total length: 11,22 metres, in leporello folding; Commentary: Preface in German by F. Anders, Vienna. “Notes on the Codex Zouche-Nuttall” in English by N. P. Troike, Austin. Altogether 60 pp. Facsimile and introductory text encased in box with leather spine. CODICES SELECTI, Vol. LXXXIV
- Robert Lloyd Williams: The Complete Codex Zouche-Nuttall: Mixtec Lineage Histories and Political Biographies (The Linda Schele Series in Maya and Pre-Columbian Studies) 2013, University of Texas Press, ISBN 978-0292744387
