= Tilantongo =

Human settlement in Mexico

- Ñuu Tnoo-Huahi Andehui (Mixtec)
- Location within Mexico
- 17°15′N 97°17′W
- Periods: Postclassic
- Cultures: Mixtec
- Location: Oaxaca, Mexico
- Region: Oaxaca

Site notes
- Archaeologists: Alfonso Caso
- Discovered: 1960s

Tilantongo was a Mixtec city-state and Postclassic political centre in the Mixteca Alta region of the modern-day state of Oaxaca, which is now visible as an archeological site near the modern town of Santiago Tilantongo.

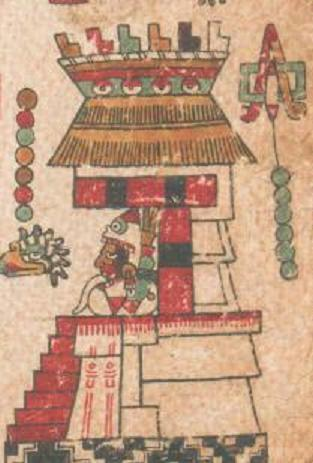
Tilantongo, Temple of Heaven, from Codex Nuttall

== Toponymy ==
Tilantongo seems to be the Nahuatl translation of the original Mixtec name. Tillantonco meaning 'at the small black place' (tlilli 'black)', -ton diminutive, -co locative). In Mixtec, this site was known as Ñuu Tnoo-Huahi Andehui meaning 'Black Town-Temple of Heaven.' Although, modern day speakers of the local variant simply call the town ÑūTnúu, The Black Town (Also referenced to as the Charred Town, Burnt Town, and other names).

== History ==
Archeological excavations conducted by Alfonso Caso in the 1960s suggest that Tilantongo is among the oldest settlements in Oaxaca with architecture from the preclassic Monte Albán I phase. Preclassic and Classic remains were found at Monte Negro and the Postclassic settlement was located in the present day town of Tilantongo, slightly north of the Classic settlement.

The documentary record shows that Tilantongo was an important Mixtec polity in the Postclassic period. Mixtec picture codices, such as the Codex Zouche-Nuttall and Codex Bodley, tell the history of Lord 8 Deer who ruled Tilantongo in the eleventh century, and how he linked the Tilantongo dynasty with the central Mexican Toltecs.
