= San Juan Teita =

- Municipality and town
- Location in Mexico
- Coordinates: 17°06′N 97°25′W
- Country: Mexico
- State: Oaxaca

Area
  - Total: 77.82 km^{2} (30.05 sq mi)

Population (2005)
  - Total: 511
- Time zone: UTC-6 (Central Standard Time)

San Juan Teita is a town and municipality in Oaxaca in south-western Mexico. The municipality covers an area of 77.82 km^{2}. It is part of the Tlaxiaco District in the south of the Mixteca Region.

As of 2005, the municipality had a total population of 511.
