= Chalcatongo de Hidalgo =

- Municipality and town
- Location in Mexico
- Coordinates: 17°02′N 97°35′W
- Country: Mexico
- State: Oaxaca

Area
  - Total: 111 km^{2} (43 sq mi)

Population (2005)
  - Total: 2,091
- Time zone: UTC-6 (Central Standard Time)

Chalcatongo de Hidalgo (also, Chalcatongo and Villa Hidalgo) (Mixtec: Ñuundaya, 'place of the underworld') is a municipality in the Mexican state of Oaxaca. It is part of the Tlaxiaco District in the south of the Mixteca Region.

It is the birthplace of former Governor Ulises Ruiz Ortiz.
