= Magdalena Jaltepec =

- Municipality and town
- Location in Mexico Magdalena Jaltepec (Mexico)
- Coordinates: 17°19′N 97°13′W
- Country: Mexico
- State: Oaxaca

Area
  - Total: 184.99 km^{2} (71.43 sq mi)
- Elevation: 2,020 m (6,630 ft)

Population (2010)
  - Total: 3,313
- Time zone: UTC-6 (Central)

Magdalena Jaltepec is a town and municipality in Oaxaca in southwestern Mexico. The municipality covers an area of 184.99 km^{2}. It is part of the Nochixtlán District in the southeast of the Mixteca Region.

As of 2005, the municipality had a total population of 3,463.

The community's 16th-century church boasts a number of colonial-era polychrome and other santos (statues of Roman Catholic saints).

== See also ==
- Jaltepec River
- Jaltepec Mixe
