= La Mixteca =

Socio-cultural region of Southern Mexico

- People: Mixtec ñuù savi, nayívi savi, ñuù davi, nayivi davi
- Language: Mixtec sa'an davi, da'an davi, tu'un savi,..
- Country: Mixteca; Ñuu Savi, Ñuu Djau, Ñuu Davi,..

La Mixteca (Nahuatl languages: Mixtecapan) is a cultural, economic and political region in Western Oaxaca and neighboring portions of Puebla and Guerrero in south-central Mexico, which refers to the home of the Mixtec people. In their languages, the region is called either Ñuu Djau, Ñuu Davi or Ñuu Savi. Two-thirds of all Mixtecs live in the region, and the entire national population of Mixtecs in Mexico was 500,000 in 1999.

The region covers some 40,000 km^{2} (15,000 sq mi) where two of the country's mountain ranges, the Trans-Mexican Volcanic Belt and Sierra Madre del Sur, converge.

== Geography ==
La Mixteca is a country of great contrasts. The Sierra Madre del Sur and the Neo-Volcanic Belt mark its northern limits. To the east, it is defined by the Cuicatlán Valley and the Central Valleys of Oaxaca. To the west, the Mixteca region is adjacent to the valleys of Morelos and the central portion of Guerrero. To the south lies 200 miles of Pacific Ocean coastline. Because of the presence of the major mountains of the Sierra Mixteca, communications with the rest of the country are difficult. The region tends to be remote, poor, and little-visited.

The region is conventionally divided into three separate areas, defined by the prevailing height of the terrain:

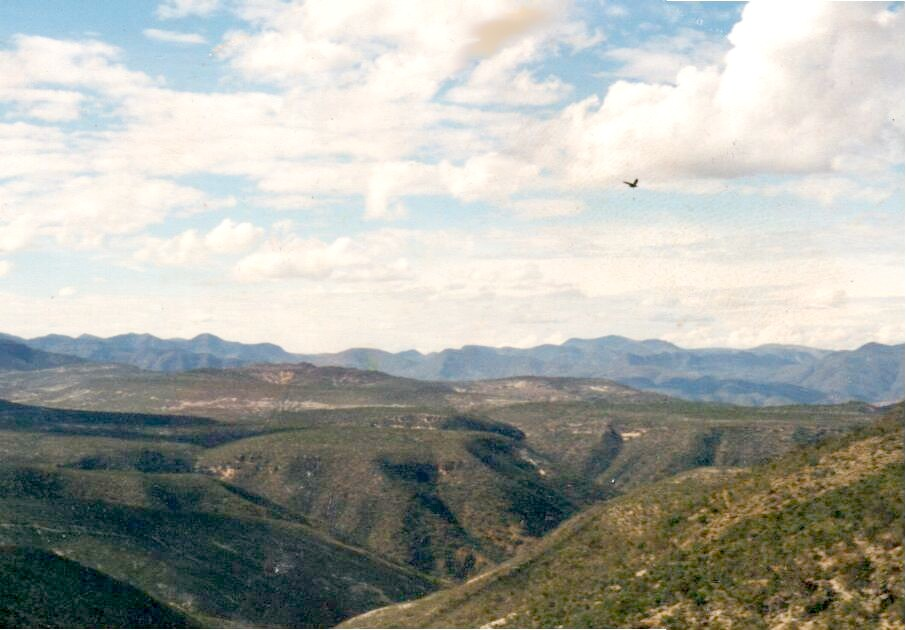
The Sierra Mixteca, near Nativitas Monte Verde, in Oaxaca

- Mixteca Baja ("Low Mixteca"; Ñuu I'ni): northwest Oaxaca and southwest Puebla.
- Mixteca Alta ("High Mixteca"; Ñuu Ñuma): northeast Guerrero and western Oaxaca.
- Mixteca de la Costa ("Coastal Mixteca"): the area also known as the Costa Chica, the remote Pacific coastline of eastern Guerrero and western Oaxaca, home to Mixteca, Amuzgo, and Afro-Mexicans

== See also ==
- Achiutla
- Technological University of the Mixteca
