= Tehuantepec =

City and municipality in Oaxaca, Mexico

Tehuantepec Guisi'si Gui
- City & Municipality
- Santo Domingo Tehuantepec
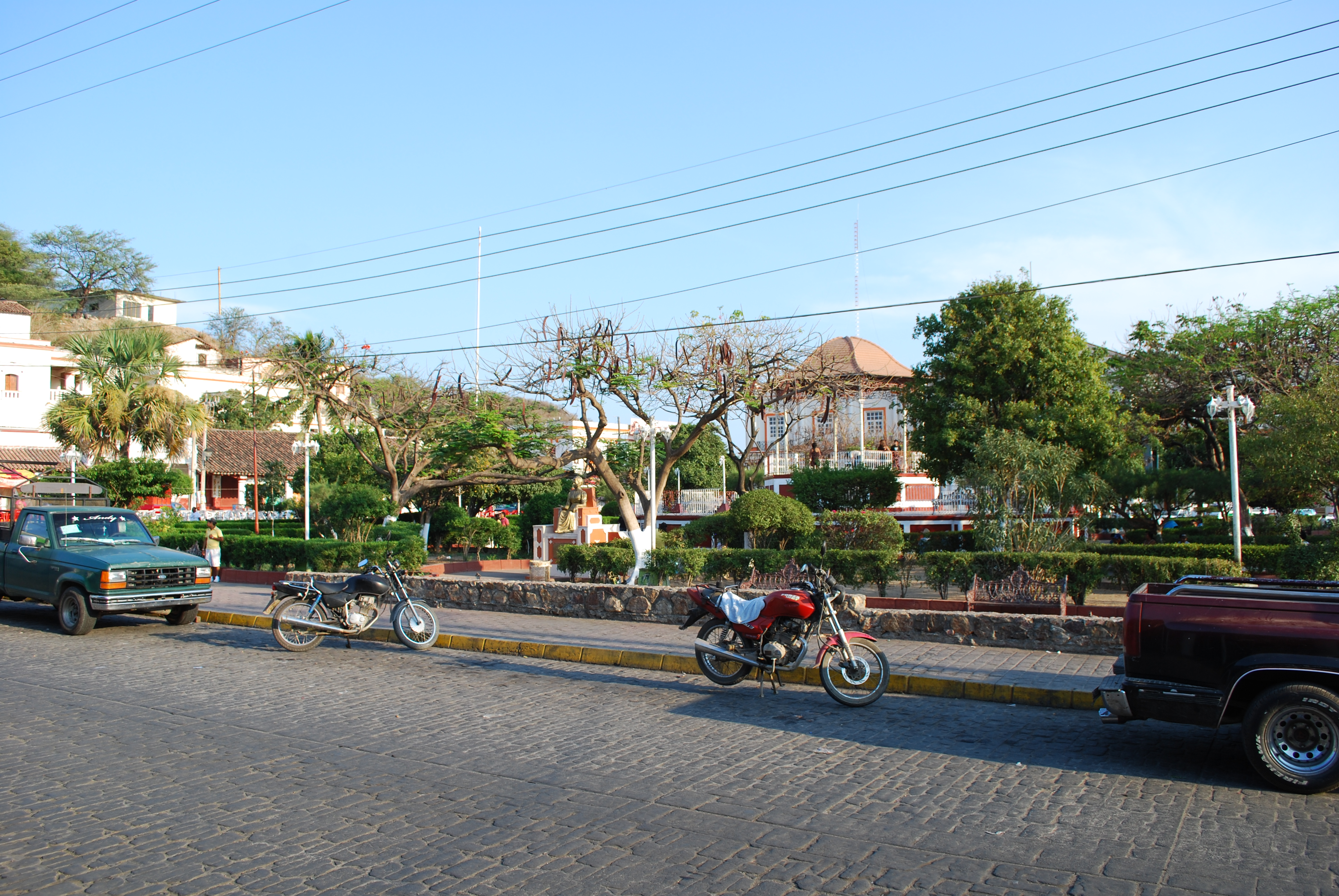
- View of the main square of the city

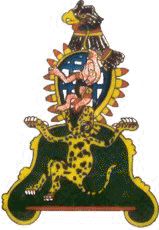
- Coat of arms

- Location in Mexico
- Coordinates: 16°19′28″N 95°14′20″W
- Country: Mexico
- State: Oaxaca
- District: Tehuantepec District
- Founded: 15th century

Government
  - Municipal President: José Luis Villalobos

Area
  - Municipality: 965.8 km^{2} (372.9 sq mi)
  - seat: 16.6 km^{2} (6.4 sq mi)
- Elevation: 55 m (180 ft)

Population (2020 census)
  - Municipality: 67,739
  - Density: 70.14/km^{2} (181.7/sq mi)
  - Seat: 45,134
  - Seat density: 2,720/km^{2} (7,040/sq mi)
- Time zone: UTC-6 (Central (US Central))
- Postal code (of seat): 70760

Tehuantepec (Spanish pronunciation: [tewanteˈpek], in full, Santo Domingo Tehuantepec) is a city and municipality in the southeast of the Mexican state of Oaxaca. It is part of the Tehuantepec District in the west of the Istmo Region. The area was important in pre-Hispanic period as part of a trade route that connected Central America with what is now the center of Mexico. Later it became a secondary capital of the Zapotec dominion, before it was conquered by the Spanish in the early 16th century.

The city is still the center of Zapotec culture in the Isthmus of Tehuantepec and is the second largest in the region. The city is known for its women and their traditional dress, which was adopted by Frida Kahlo. Tehuantepec has a reputation for being a matriarchal society. Women dominate the local markets and are known to taunt men. However, political power is still the domain of men.

The city experienced a short economic boom in the early 20th century related to a rail line that was built linking the two oceans, but it was soon eclipsed by the Panama Canal. The project, however, has revived since 2018, as the Mexican government has worked on the rehabilitation of the line and other projects related to it, in a project known as the Interoceanic Corridor of the Isthmus of Tehuantepec.

== Description and history ==
Tehuantepec is the second largest city on the Isthmus of Tehuantepec in the south of Mexico. Founded by the Zapotecs in the period just before the arrival of the Spanish in the 16th century, Tehuantepec remains the center of Zapotec culture in the Isthmus. One important symbol of this culture is the image of a Zapotec woman from the area called La Tehuana. In the 2000s, a sculpture of this figure was created by Miguel Hernández Urbán from the State of Mexico. The sculpture is found at the main entrance to the city of Tehuantepec, made of local marble and fine wood along with stainless steel brought from Mexico City. The work made Hernández an "adopted son" of the city. The city remains home to many traditions and customs which are centuries old, with many, especially in the market, still favoring the Zapotec language over Spanish. The city reached its height in the early 20th century with the arrival of the railroad. However, since then the importance of this railroad had severely diminished by the building of the Panama Canal. Today the city is considered to be poor, with many of its buildings in disrepair. Many survive on subsistence commerce. Many motorcycle taxi operators in Tehuantepec and other cities in Oaxaca are underage, between 13 and 15. The city also has had problems with stray dogs including an incident when about twenty dogs took over the main entrance.

Despite the circumstances, the government of Andrés Manuel López Obrador revived the railroad and started working on its rehabilitation, as part of the project known as Interoceanic Corridor of the Isthmus of Tehuantepec (abbreviated in Spanish as CIIT), modernizing the railroad line and planning the construction of 10 industrial parks across the Isthmus of Tehuantepec. The project has often been described as a potential "competitor" to the Panama Canal, but the project's administration believes it will work as a "complement" to it. Though the project has raised some controversy over environmental and other such social issues, it is expected to contribute to the country's economic growth and the industrial development of the South of Mexico. It is planned to open for passenger operations in December 2023 and for other related works to be completed by July 2024.

Tehuantepec and nearby Juchitán have had a fierce rivalry dating back to the 19th century. In 1862, Napoleon III sent French troops to collect on debts Mexico owed. Those Frenchmen allied themselves with local Mexican conservatives who allowed them to occupy the Isthmus area. Both Juchitán and Tehuantepec resisted the occupation until a captain in Tehuantepec switched sides. When the Juchitecos learned of this, they attacked Tehuantepec, suffering a defeat. Four year later, this same captain attacked Juchitán but was defeated as well. After the French left in 1862, Juchitán attacked Tehuantepec as a personal vendetta. Although there has been no blood shed since then, the rivalry and competitive attitudes have carried into modern times. Each has tried to outdo the other in festivals in both quantity and quality. The two communities mock one another in looks, hairstyles and clothing.

The center of the city has colonial era constructions such as the Santo Domingo Monastery from the 16th century, which is also the main cathedral. The former monastery part of the cathedral complex houses the Casa de Cultura or cultural center. The monastery was remodeled for this purpose at a cost of 50,000 pesos, mostly to rehabilitate walls and ceiling vaults. This Casa de Cultura houses the Museo de Antropología e Historia Zapoteca del Istmo, which contains archeological and artistic artifacts from the region. The museum has halls dedicated to archeology, ethnographic studies, the history of the Mexican Revolution and the Reform War, as well as items related to religion, regional dress, housing and folk art. It also has a library. The municipal palace was built during the railroad boom in the early 20th century. Covering an entire side of the main plaza, it today towers over the other buildings in the center. It is built in provincial Neoclassical style with massive columns and arches. However, the back of the structure is very different, as it is an irregular pattern of brickwork, which looks like it has half collapsed. In reality, the structure was never completed. Since 1906, the city has promised to finish the building, but never has. Even the federal government in 1975 announced plans to not only finish the building but restore many of the churches and plazas, but they never came to fruition.

=== Tehuantepec market ===
The most important institution in the city is the market. There are four traditional markets with the most important of these located just off the main square. The main market building was built by the city in 1970, with booths in this market now worth as much as $30,000 pesos. The owners of the booths pay a small trust fee which is used for public works projects. These are supplemented by tianguis markets in the Guichivere neighborhood on Wednesdays and one in Reoloteca neighborhood on Sundays. The market is the center of nearly all commerce in the city, with 95% of the goods small enough to carry sold there. As a result, the city lacks department, electronics, clothing, jewelry and other types of stores.

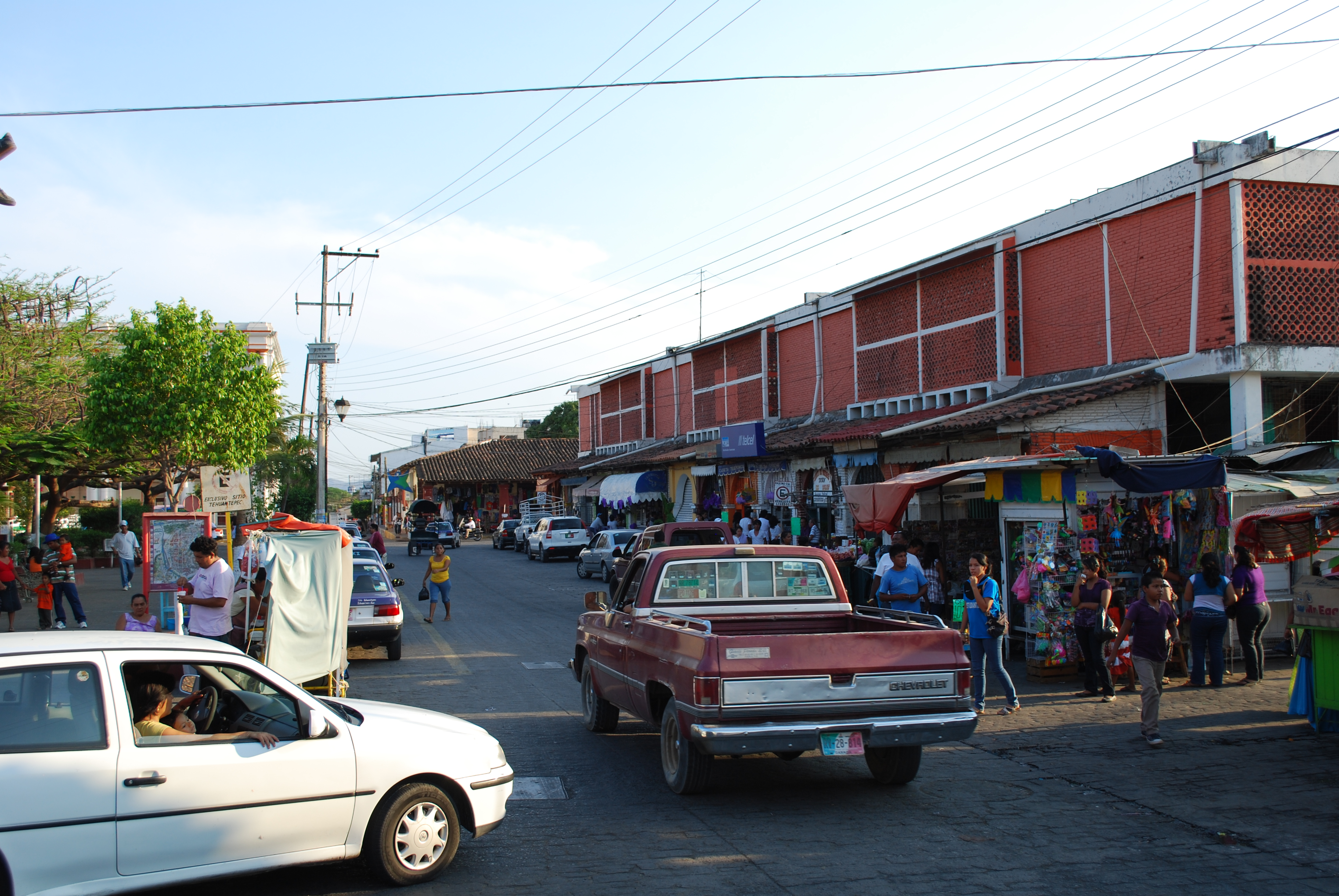
View of the main municipal market

==== Tehuanas ====
The city's markets are dominated by women, known as Tehuanas, who make up nearly all of the buyers and sellers. Until the 1970s, there was a complete ban on men in this area, but this was relaxed at that time. Today still it is estimated that less than five percent of the people seen in the market are men. The historical reason for this is that traditionally women worked in the markets as men worked in the fields. Today still, men in the market can be subjected to taunts by the women who question their masculinity. The dominance of women in the markets, and the city in general in the daytime, made the city an interest starting in the 19th century. The writings of French traveler and historian Brasseur de Bourbourg and later by Mexican educator José Vasconcelos described Tehuantepec as a matriarchial society. Later writings went as far as stating that the birth of a daughter was cause for celebration and men turned over their wages over to women. This depiction of the women of Tehuantepec focused on three factors: their dominance in the markets; their unreserved manner, often ridiculing men publicly; and that they bathed partially nude in the local river.

In the early 20th century, painter Frida Kahlo (1907–1954) adopted Tehuana traditional dress in solidarity with these women and depict Tehuana traditional dress in paintings such as Memory, the Heart. Much of the Tehuanas' dominance, however, seems to be limited today to the market and to household finances. They earn money primarily through commerce and have the right to use this income as they wish, regardless of what their husbands or other family members say. Men dominate municipal politics, however, in Tehuantepec and other areas in the southern Isthmus. Women may participate in strikes, protests and other political movements but do not generally hold positions of power such as municipal president or council member. Even when they do, they hold less powerful portfolios usually related to education and health.

The role model for Tehuana women was a woman by the name of Juana Cata Romero who lived in the late 19th and early 20th century. She began as a humble candy seller, but rose to become a local power broker and one of the most revered figures in the city. Romero rose to prominence by befriending a young soldier, then Lieutenant Colonel Porfirio Díaz. Díaz was charged with guarding the town against plots and rebellions by Conservatives during the Reform War. Juana Cata allied herself with Díaz's cause by signaling opportune times to attack Conservative forces. Juana became head of Díaz's intelligence service as well as his lover for four decades, although both married others. The alliance made Juana the richest and most powerful woman in Tehuantepec, owning various sugar and coconut plantations and even the Isthmus of Tehuantepec railroad was built to pass by her house.

Romero's house remains in Tehuantepec, which was the only two-story structure in the town when it was built. It was designed to look like a French chalet with north and west wings that come off of a circular entryway. The structure stands out from the surrounding 18th-century Spanish architecture around it.

The city constructed a bronze statue of Romero but it is controversial. The statue depicts a stern, conservatively dressed woman holding an open book. Many claim the statue is a misrepresentation. The plinth notes her works of charity in her later years, but the real reason she is admired is that she amassed her wealth and power using her looks and shrewdness, considered a Tehuana trait.

== Velas ==
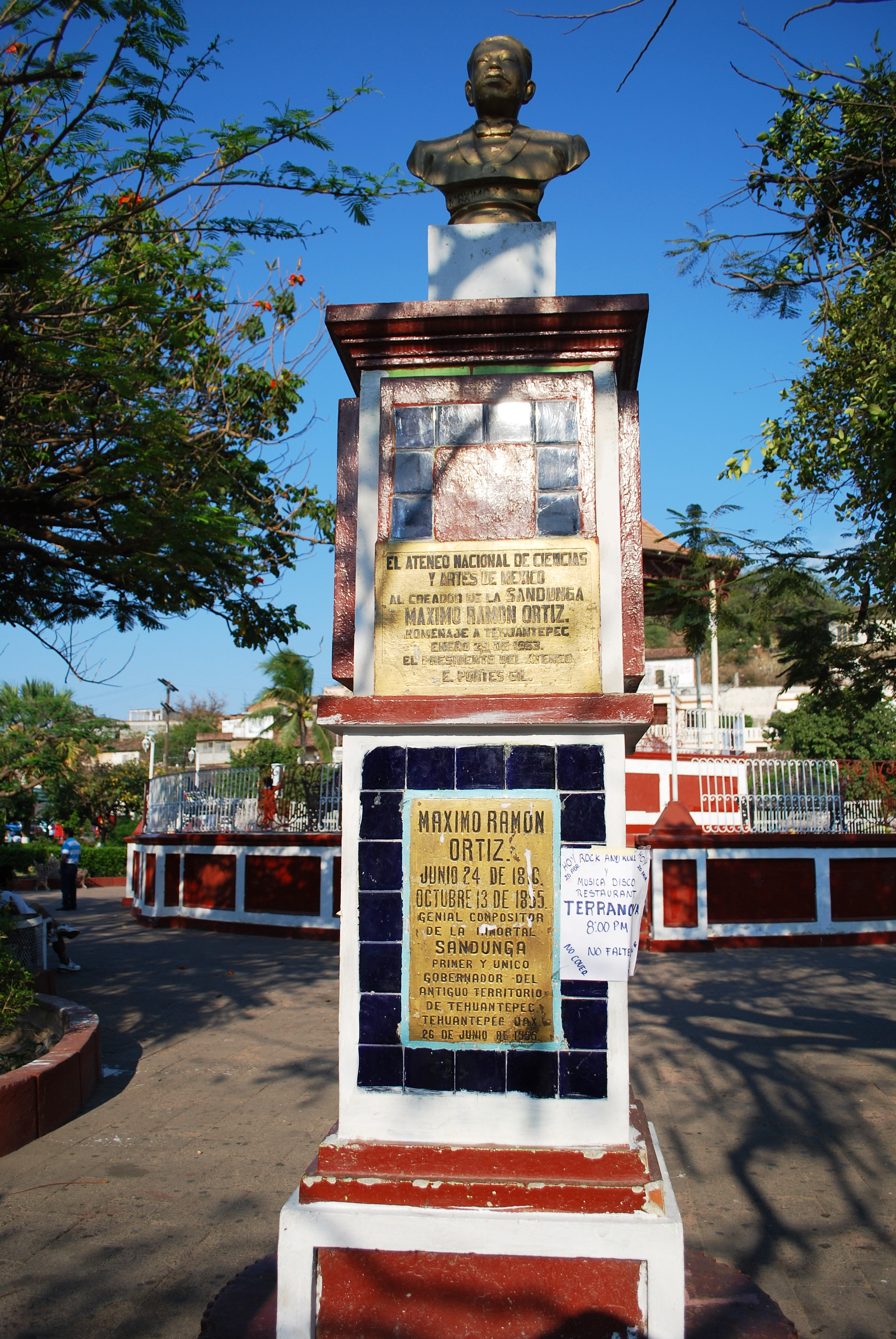
Monument to Maximo Ramon Ortiz in the main square

The rest of the city is divided into fifteen neighborhoods called barrios, each of which has its own church. Each of these churches have their own patron saint, which is celebrated each year during an event called a "vela." Velas are celebrations of pre-Hispanic origin which occur in each neighborhood in the Isthmus area which consist of processions in the main streets and the offering of a ceremonial candle to the patron saint. Each of the "velas" are organized by a mayordomo and includes a "queen" who is crowned with flowers. These velas became annual events starting in the 19th century with European elements such as balls or dances added. These dances have fabrics for decoration, like in Europe in the 19th century, but these have been modified with include indigenous designs, many laboriously embroidered by hand. For these and other special events, women may wear traditional Tehuana dress, which consists of heavily embroidered garments accessorized with large amounts of gold jewelry. This jewelry often contains old, gold bearing coins and gold filigree earrings. In addition, local specialties such as various mole sauces such as negro, rojo, amarillo, coloradito, chichilo as well as tasajo, fresh corn quesadillas and tamales are served. While they began as religious festivals, today, most have lost their religious basis. Most of these velas occur in the summer. The vela of Santa María Reoloteca occurs between 13 and 18 August. The Vela of Guiexoba occurs at the beginning of the year. The neighborhood is divided into north and south into a friendly rivalry of who can bring the best musicians from various parts of the state. In addition there are citywide velas such as the Vela Tehuantepec on 26 December, but the most important is the Vela Sandunga at the end of May.

The Vela Sandunga celebrates a song called La Sandunga, which is considered to be the region's anthem, learned by all in the region. The lyrics were written by Maximo Ramon Ortiz in 1853, and honors Tehuantepec women. Ortiz supported the separation of the Isthmus area from the Mexican government to form the Territorio Libre del Tehuantepec and wrote the song in part to promote the idea of a separate Tehuantepec identity. The music is thought to be based on a melody from Andalucia and rearranged by Zapotec musician Andres Gutierrez or Ndre Sa'a, his name in Zapotec. It is considered to be a "mestizo"song because it contains both European and indigenous elements.

To commemorate the song's creation, there is a large festival that lasts a week. It includes parties, and presentations of musicians from the Conservatoire de Paris, which has a similar festival in honor of the opening of the opera La Traviata by Giuseppe Verdi. It also includes the election of a festival queen and a parade dedicated to the evolution of Tehuantepec traditional dress. The event ends with a procession in honor of Saint Dominic, the patron saint of the Isthmus.

== The municipality ==
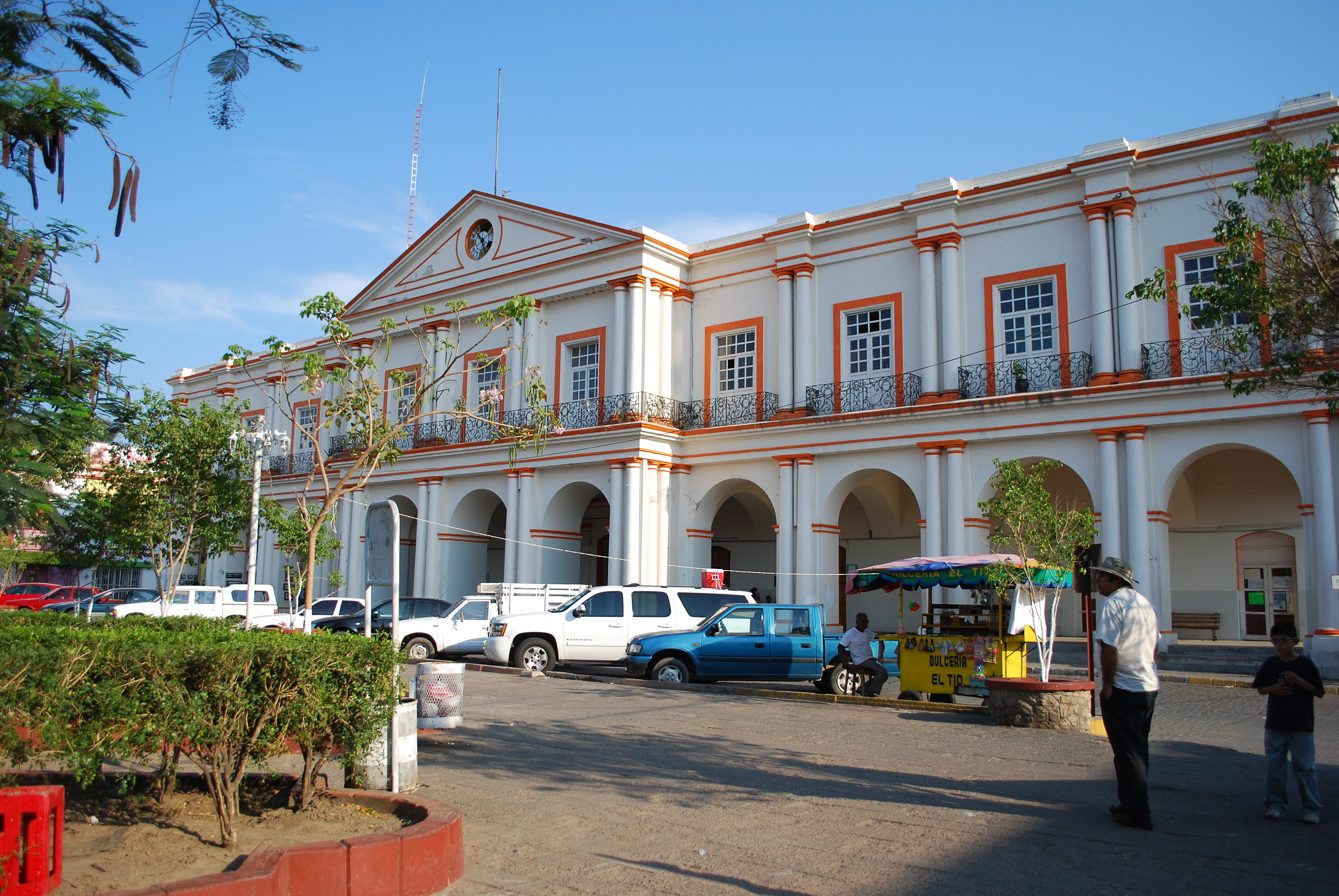
Municipal palace of Tehuantepec

As the municipal seat, the city of Tehuantepec is the local governing authority for about 120 communities, which together cover an area of 965.8 km^{2}. The main communities of the municipality outside the city proper are Concepción Bamba, Morro Mazatán, San José El Paraíso, Santa Cruz Bamba, Santa Isabel de la Reforma, Aguascalientes de Mazatán, Buenos Aires, Colonia Jordán, Guelaguechi, Las Cruces, Potrero de Carballo, Potrero de San Miguel Tenango, Rincón Moreno, San Francisco, San Juan Zaragoza, Santa Gertrudis Miramar, Zanjón y Garrapatero, Cajón de Piedra, Pishishi, San Vicente Mazatán, Santa Clara, Santa Cruz Hidalgo, Colonia San Luis, El Limón, La Noria, San Andrés Villa Zapata, Santa Rita and Ejido El Jordán. It borders the municipalities of Santa María Jalapa de Marqués, Santa María Mixtequilla, Magdalena Tlacotepec, San Pedro Huamelula, San Miguel Tenango, Magdalena Tequisistlán, San Pedro Comitancillo, San Blas Atempa and Salina Cruz with the Pacific Ocean to the south. The municipal government consists of a municipal president, two "sindicos" and 17 officials called regidores.

As of 2005, the municipality had a total of 13,555 homes, with almost all owned by their residents. Flooring varies from packed earth to brick and cement with walls of adobe, brick and block and with roofs of tiles or concrete slabs. As of 2005, there were just over 5,300 people who spoke an indigenous language, out of a total population of just over 55,000. The Pan-American Highway passes through the municipality, connecting it to Salina Cruz. Another highway connects it to Coatzacoalcos.

Major elevations include El Zacatal (1,040 masl), Cerro de la Marimba (1,257 masl), Guiengola (1,257) and Tecuani (700 masl). Within the city proper there are a number of hills which carry names such as El Tigre (Dani’i Guie Be’edxe in Zapotec), Crux Padre López, El Zopilote, Vixhana and La Cueva. All of these are under 425 meters above sea level. There one river with the same name, which cuts through the city. Its Zapotec name is Guigu Roo Guisii. This rivers starts in the Miahuatlán Sierra and empties into the Pacific Ocean at La Ventosa in Salina Cruz. The climate is hot and humid with rains in spring, summer and fall. It can be windy at times with prevailing winds blowing north to south or vice versa. The vegetation is mostly deciduous with guanacaste, oak, guirisiña, granadillo (Rhamnus alaternus), mango, chicozapote, hierba de cancer (Cuphea procumbens) and others dominating. Wildlife includes deer, armadillos, rabbits, eagles, quail and mimus.

== History ==
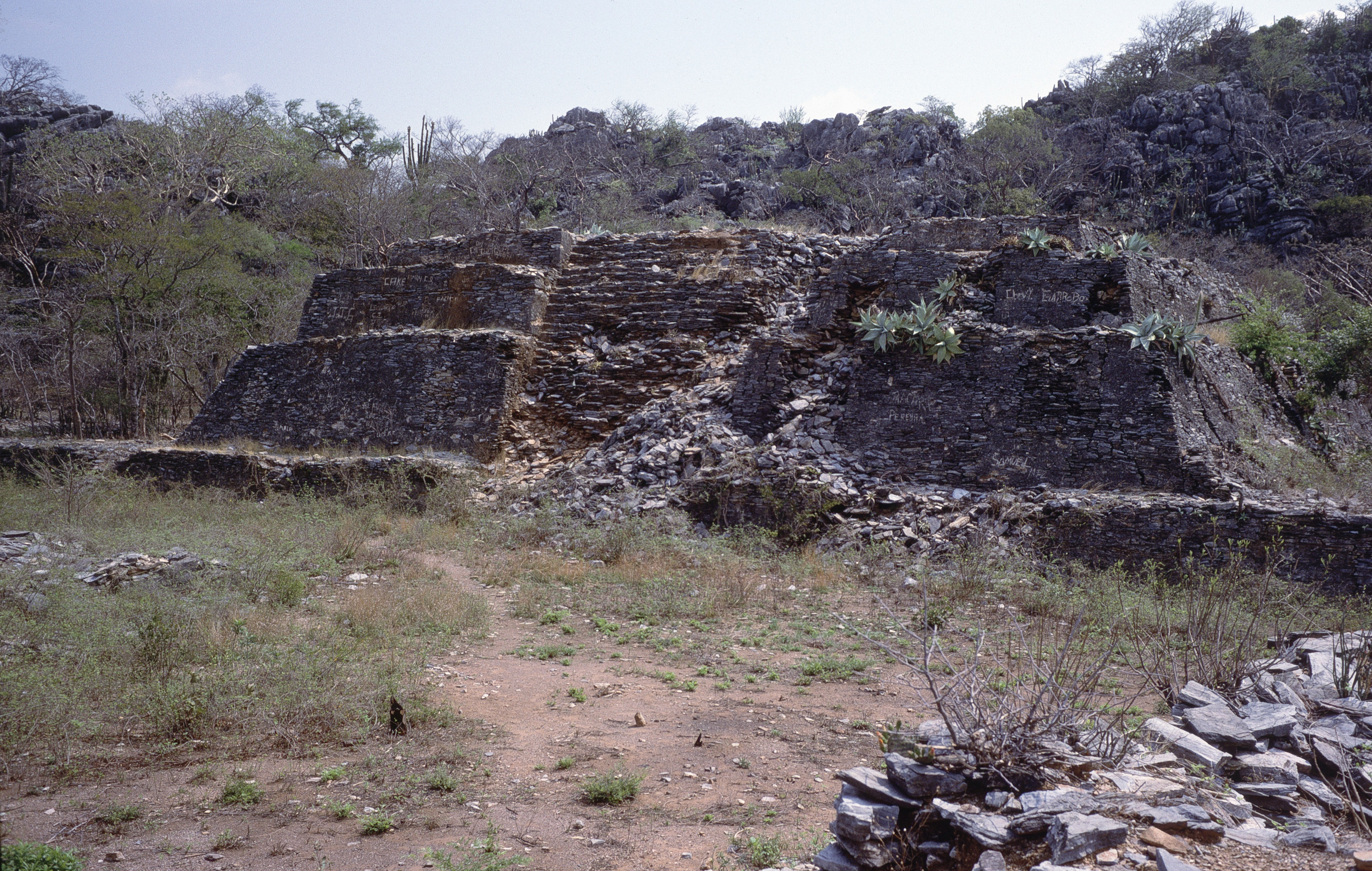
East pyramid of Guiengola

The full name of the city and municipality is Santo Domingo Tehuantepec. "Tehuantepec" comes from Nahuatl and has been generally regarded to mean "wild animal (tecuani) hill (tepec)". The name was given to the area by the Aztecs, purportedly because of the ferocity of the native Zapotec warriors they encountered there. The Zapotec name for the area is Guie-Ngola, or Large Hill/Rock, with the city name being Guisi’si Gui. Santo Domingo was added by Bartolomé de las Casas as he passed by in honor of the Dominican church which had already been established here. From pre-Hispanic times, the settlement has been represented by an Aztec glyph, the earliest example of which comes from the Guevea Codex, also known as the Zapotec Codex. This glyph represents a hill with a jaguar, an ancient totem animal throughout Mesoamerica. Thus, the "wild animal" component of the hill's name may actually be related to a recognition of an ancient religious meeting site associated with the symbol of the jaguar. The Nahuatl word "tehuan" actually means "among the people" or "a gathering", i.e. a meeting place.

The hill is divided into sixty-six parts and each part has a circle.

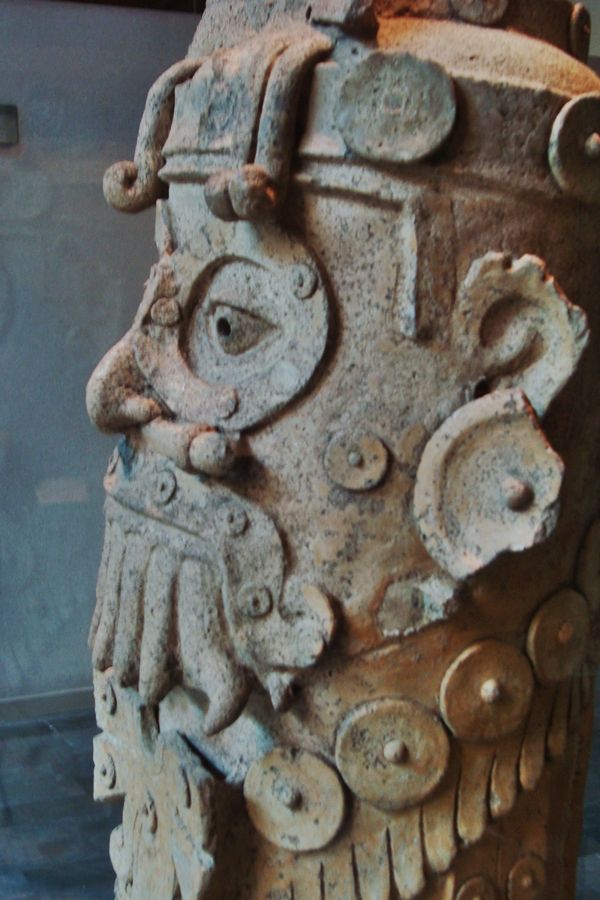
Image of Dzahui, god of rain from the Isthmus of Tehuantepec

The archeology of the area around the city is little studied, in part because the main archeological sites are difficult to access and the climate of the southern Isthmus makes excavation work difficult. Much of the area's early cultural interactions are only speculated about but it is known there was contact with Teotihuacan, Tula, Monte Albán and later, Tenochtitlan. The Tehuantepec area in the very early Pre-Classic period was on the periphery of the zone where the Olmecs had influence as is noted by artifacts. The area's initial importance was not as a center of a dominion but rather as part of a trade route which connected Central America with what is now central Mexico. Through its trade routes passed manta rays, jade, other precious stones, shells, sponges, gold, amber, salt, feathers, furs, cotton, spices, honey and cocoa. The main control point for this trade route in this area was most likely Lass Gui’e’e, according to recent excavations. This site has a history of at least 3500 years with figures of Olmec and Chiapas origin found in its oldest sections. This and the abundance of marine shells indicate that this site in the Cañada de Tehuantepec was the main axis of communication between the Oaxacan highlands the Isthmus of Tehuantepec and into Guatemala since early in Mesoamerican history.

The Zapotec kingdom of Zaachila expanded into the Tehuantepec area under Cosijoeza starting in 1487, pushing the native Huaves to the narrow coastal strips around the Tehuantepec lagoons. With this, the Zapotecs gained control of the salt deposits of the area, which was a valuable commodity. Tehuantepec became a second Zapotec capital. This dominion had relations with the Aztecs but did not pay tribute and controlled the trade route to Central America. The influence of this dominion extended west to Nexapa and along the coast to Tlapanatepec. Tequixixtlan and Xallapan were subordinate dominions, ruled by governors sent from Tehuantepec. Tehuantepec increased in importance as the original capital of Zaachila came under pressure from the Mixtecs and later from the Aztecs by the end of the 15th century. The Aztecs’ interest here was the control the trade route between the Mexican Plateau to Soconusco in Chiapas and into Guatemala. The Aztecs attacked Tehuantepec in 1496, and it was defended by an alliance of Mixtecs and Zapotecs. These two groups normally fought each other, but allied in the face of the foreign threat. This and the city's formidable defenses led to a seven-month siege under Aztec ruler Axayacatl. The next Aztec chief Ahuitzotl, decided to marry his daughter Coyolicatzin to the Zapotec king Cosijoeza. This ended the war.

At the time of the Conquest and for some time after, the area was dominated by three linguistic groups, Zapotec, Mixe and Chontal, which are unrelated. The Zapotecs occupied the area from the Sierra Madre del Sur and Xallapan up to Tehuantepec. The Chontales were found between Mazatlán and Tequixixtlan. The Mixes occupied the high mountain areas, centered in Utlatepec.

Cosijoeza's son Cosijopii became the ruler of Tehuantepec shortly before the arrival of the Spanish in 1518. Pedro de Alvarado made two incursions from the west in 1522 arriving to the Mixe area of Ultatepec and Xoconochco. Alvarado entered Tehuantepec again in 1524, subduing the local population in Tequixixtlan and Xallapan. However, many years passed before the Spanish had full control of the area. After the Conquest, Cosijopii remained the head of the city, but subject to Spanish hegemony from 1521 until his death in 1563.

There is little information about the development of the Tehuantepec area during the colonial period, especially economically. However, one of the first colonial shipyards El Carbón, was established at the mouth of the Rover Tehuantepec. Timber was plentiful in the area, but other shipbuilding supplies had to be brought from Veracruz, on the Atlantic coast. The route up the navigable Coatzacoalcos River then on land to El Carbón to was the most straightforward route to the Pacific coast. This is the route that was later proposed for a canal across the Isthmus of Tehuantepec and was later followed by the Tehuantepec Railway. At the end of 1532, two ships were built to become part of the flotilla of Diego Hurtado de Mendoza but they wrecked on the coast of what is now Jalisco. More ships were built for exploration and trade along the coasts between California and Peru. Casaban and Junco (2020) give details of several of these ships from a document of 1535. However, soon after Hernán Cortés and other colonial authorities lost interest in the economic development of this area in favor of other areas. However, a main road called the Camino Real de Tehuantepec which connected it to other parts of what is now Oaxaca. The Spanish town of Tehuantepec was officially established by Dominican brothers Gregorio de Beteta and Bernardo de Alberquerer in 1538 and received a royal seal from Charles V in 1543. The church and monastery were constructed starting in 1544. By 1550, the city had forty-nine neighborhoods.

Further development of the Tehuantepec area focused on the Camino Real or Royal Road of Tehuantepec, which was built to control newly conquered areas, facilitate the collection of tribute and for commerce. Along the road, ranches and haciendas were established that regularized the commerce and gave social and political unity to the area. This process gave rise to conflicts between hacienda owners and the indigenous peoples as possession of lands changed. In 1660, the indigenous rebelled against Spanish authorities. The rebellion ended in 1661 in part because Philip IV put the city under direct control of the Spanish crown and issued a pardon to the rebels.

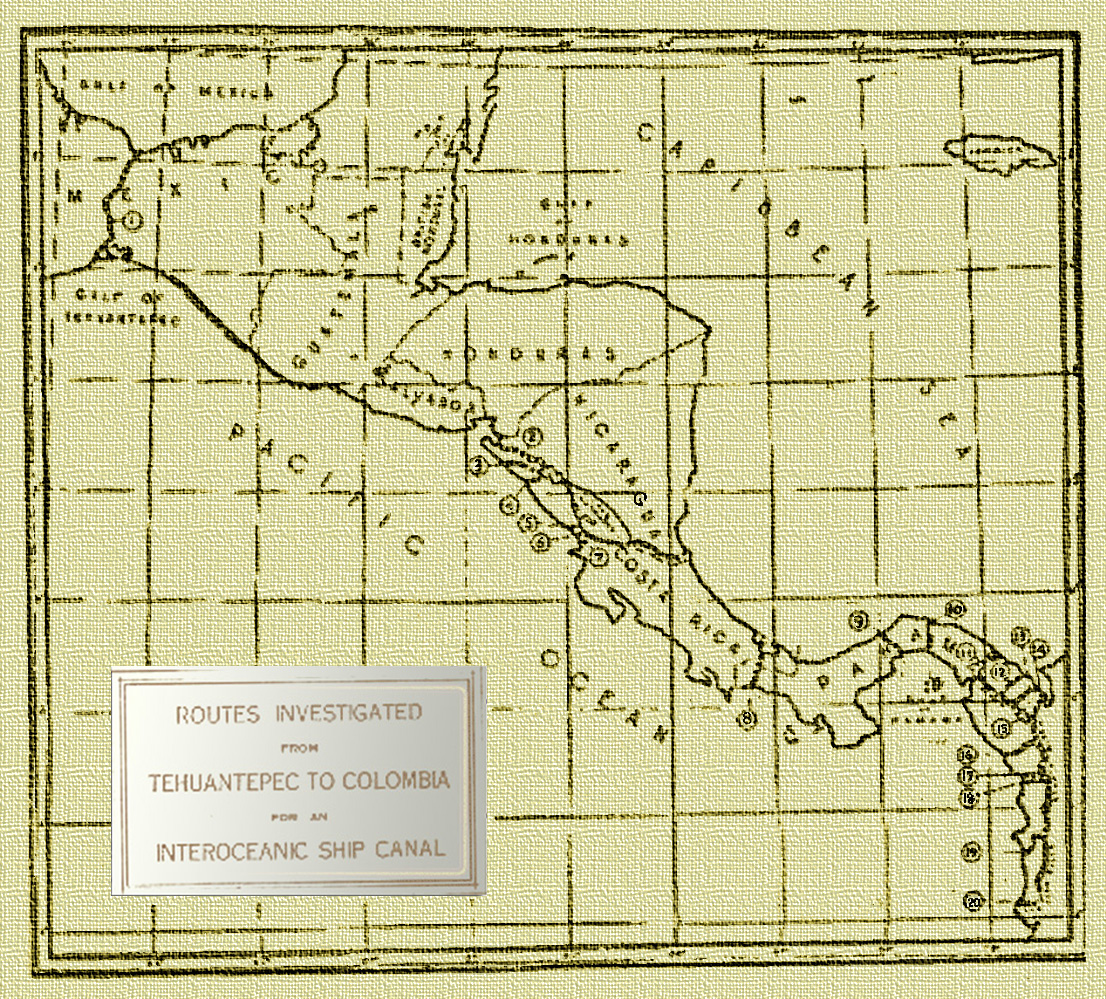
Map showing possible inter-ocean canal routes from Tehuantepec to Panama

In the mid 19th century, the United States pressured Mexico for transit rights across the Isthmus of Tehuantepec, with the aim of building a road, railway or canal for the purpose of connecting the Atlantic and Pacific Oceans for trade. Pressure was greatest during the Mexican–American War, when these transit rights were part of the first attempts at talks to end the war. However, this was not included in the Treaty of Guadalupe Hidalgo. During negotiations for the Gadsden Purchase, the issue came up again but transit rights were again denied. Despite strong interests in the area, the U.S. Army never invaded Tehuantepec, even though troops had gone as far south as southern Veracruz. However, the war drained the south of the country of soldiers and lessened control from Mexico City. As a result, the Isthmus area rebelled against rule from the city of Oaxaca. In 1850, the first plan to separate the Tehuantepec area from Oaxaca took shape. The result was the regaining of a certain amount of autonomy. A second attempt took place in 1853.

Tehuantepec gained municipal status in 1825 and town status in 1857. The Reform Laws secularized most of the lands of the Dominican order in the area.

Tehuantepec's "Golden Age" began in the early 20th century with the building and operation of the trans-Isthmus railroad, which then provided the shortest trade route between the Atlantic and Pacific Oceans. At its height, the line carried fifty trains per day, making one of the busiest railways in history. The goods and travelers brought money to the town and it grew. However, the boom ended shortly thereafter with the completion of the Panama Canal in 1914. The Pan-American Highway came through the area in the middle of the 20th century, which connected it with the rest of Mexico and by extension all the Americas. Shortly after, a modern highway connecting it to the city of Oaxaca was constructed.

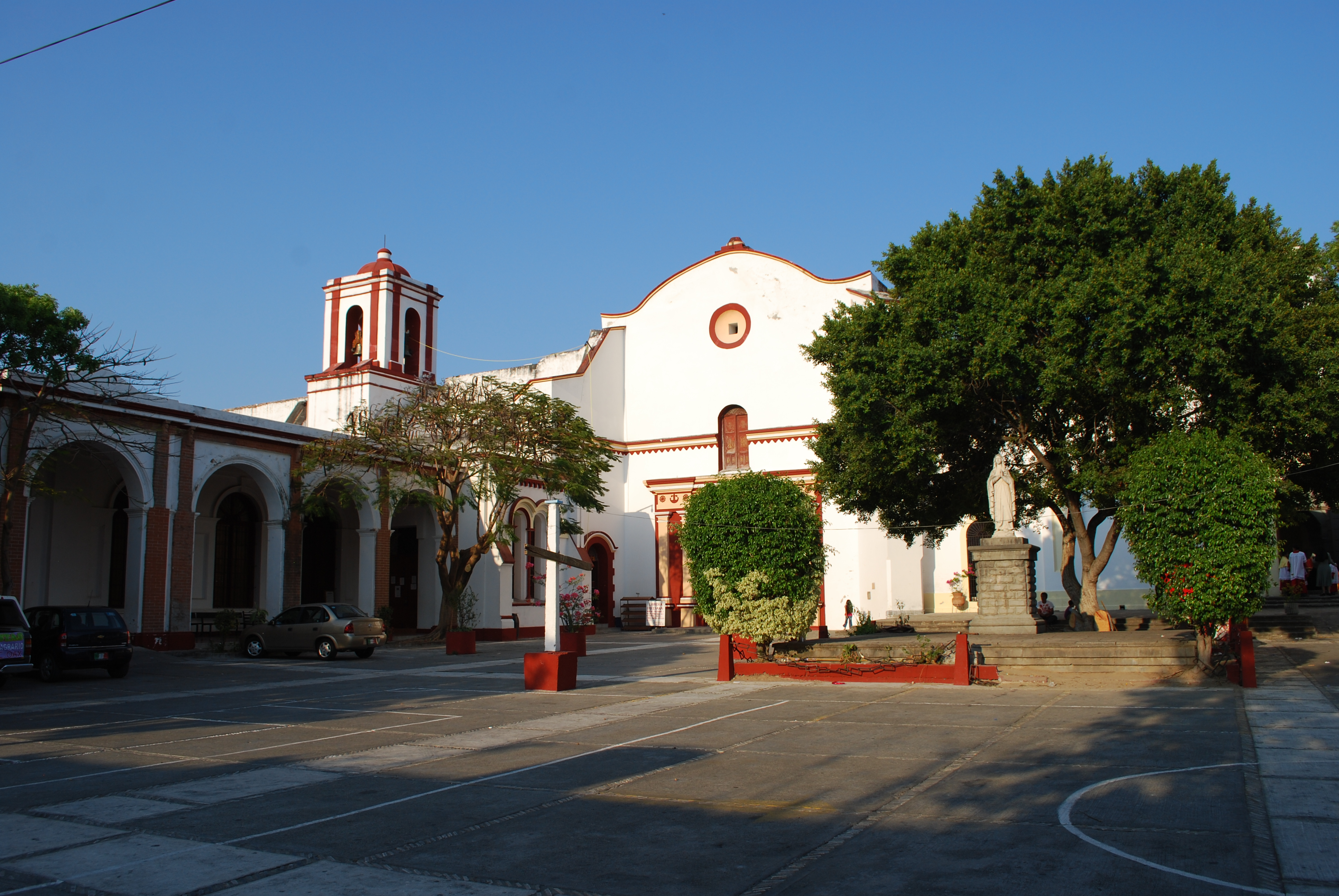
View of the Cathedral of Tehuantepec

The southern Isthmus area of Tehuantepec and Juchitán have had sporadic bouts of unrest since the late 1960s, paralleling conflicts which were occurring in other parts of Mexico. This trend continued from the 1970s to the 1990s, mostly focused on the activities of the Tehuantepec diocese under bishop Arturo Lona Reyes, who led from 1971 to his retirement in 2000. The Diocese of Tehuantepec was part of a movement to mobilize the poor and indigenous in the 1980s and 1990s, allied with other elements of the Catholic Church in Oaxaca, the CEDIPIO and others. This movement was based on the teachings of liberation theology. Bishop Arturo Lona was a strong supporter of the teachings of Vatican II calling for the creation of a "people's church". The Oaxaca church was allied with Diocese of Chiapas under Bishop Samuel Ruiz. The pastoral style of these Oaxacan and Chiapas churches came to be known as the "pastoral indígena" or indigenous pastoral and was focused explicitly on working with the most marginalized segments of society. He instituted a health clinic just outside the city of Tehuantepec basic hospital facilities and the promotion of natural medicine with the training of local healers called curanderos. There is also an ecological center on the same site promoting recycling and organic fertilizer for the area's agriculture.

During the 1980s, the diocese faced violence by regional power-holders, with two serious assassination attempts in the years before Lona's retirement. The goal of these groups was to suppress further political activism similar to the Zapatista uprising in Chiapas. Attacks against Lona and allies continued into the 1990s. Liberation theology remained center of the diocese while Lona remained bishop although it lost power in the 1990s as the country moved towards neoliberal policies as well as the Church's own gradual abandonment of liberation theology. Arturo Lona Reyes was one of the last of church leaders aligned with Liberation Theology.

The retirement of Bishop Arturo Lona Reyes drew about four thousand people, mostly native Zapotecs and Mixes. His work was recognized by the Archbishop of Oaxaca over 29 years in Tehuantepec. Lona Reyes retired from the official post but remained head of a religious group called the Iglesia Universal. The bishop stated that his "Opción por los Pobres" (Choice for the Poor) program which he heads would remain intact after he hands his resignation to the Vatican. In the "Church of the People" the offering consist of food and gifts brought by hundreds of indigenous. The bishop's sermons often contained references to those "excluded from the system," "community cooperatives" and "human rights." The current bishop of Tehuantepec is Oscar Armando Campos Cantreras.

The rail line that had been the source of Tehuantepec's boom in the early 20th century steadily declined over the remainder of the century. It and the rest in the country were privatized in 2001, but the 24 km nearest the city has become virtually abandoned with workstations dismantled and equipment sold off. This put a final end to the rail based economy of the city, especially in the Reoloteca neighborhood.

Since then, there have been several attempts to resurrect the line crossing the Isthmus of Tehuantepec. The purpose of the project is to create a competitor to the overcrowded Panama Canal. It would be a rail line between the Gulf of Mexico and the Pacific at Tehuantepec, modernizing and extending existing rail lines. This type of project was initially proposed in 1980 again in 1997, 2006 and 2009. Versions of the project would have infrastructure built in Tehuantepec and in the nearby port of Salina Cruz. These attempts, however, did not come to fruition due to the large initial investment as a primary issue. However, in 2018 the Mexican government began to work on modernizing the railroad built in 1907 with the purpose of connecting the Pacific and the Gulf, in a project that also plans to build 10 industrial parks across the Isthmus and improve the infrastructure or the local highways and the ports of Salina Cruz and Coatzacoalcos. This project is known as the Interoceanic Corridor of the Isthmus of Tehuantepec, which is expected to be completed by the end of 2023 and the middle of 2024.

Despite an income of 100 million pesos per year, the municipality has had problems with bankruptcy and few works to show for the money in 2009. The municipal president was accused of embezzling the money, leaving the city with one of its worst crises in its history.

== Economy ==
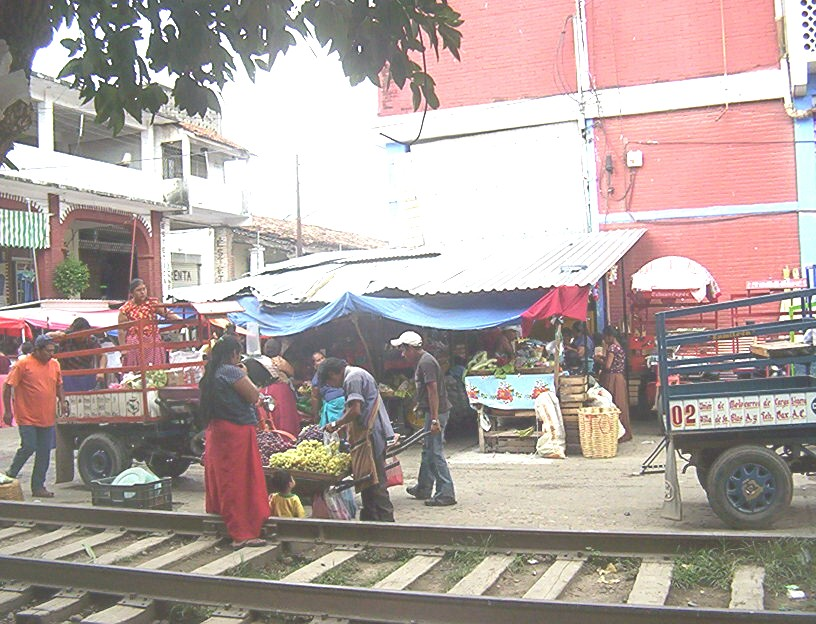
Market in Santo Domingo Tehuantepec

Twenty-one percent of the working population is in agriculture and livestock. Principle crops include beans, corn, sorghum, sesame seed, melons, cucumbers, squash, peanuts and flowers. Livestock includes cattle, pigs and goats. The Union of Indigenous Communities of the Isthmus Region, a cooperative founded in 1982, assists in production and distribution of the local products, notably coffee, under a fair trade label.

Twenty-five percent work in industry, mining and construction. Industry is limited to a water purification facility, an ice plant and one that processes calcium oxide (calidra). Limestone is mined as well. The most typical handcraft of the area is the traditional dress. There is also the production of ceramics especially for the kitchen as well as decorative items and toys.

Fifty-one percent work in commerce, tourism and services. Most of the commerce serves local needs with some serving regional customers and tourists. There are two four-star hotels, one two star hotel and nine guesthouses. The municipality also has water parks and beaches.

=== Transportation ===
On November 21, 2025, the railway station at Tehuantepec was reopened. It is currently served by Line K of Tren Interoceánico.

Preceding station	Tren Interoceánico	Following station
Salina Cruz Terminus	Line K	Comitancillo (Note: Next major station: Ixtepec) toward Tonalá
Salina Cruz Terminus	Tehuanito South	Comitancillo toward Unión Hidalgo

== Education ==
The municipality has twenty-six pre-schools, thirty-eight formal primary schools (ten of which are bilingual), five middle schools, eight distance education middle schools, seven high schools and a nursing school. The Universidad del Istmo opened in 2002 with a campus in Tehuantepec and Ixtepec.

== Archeology ==
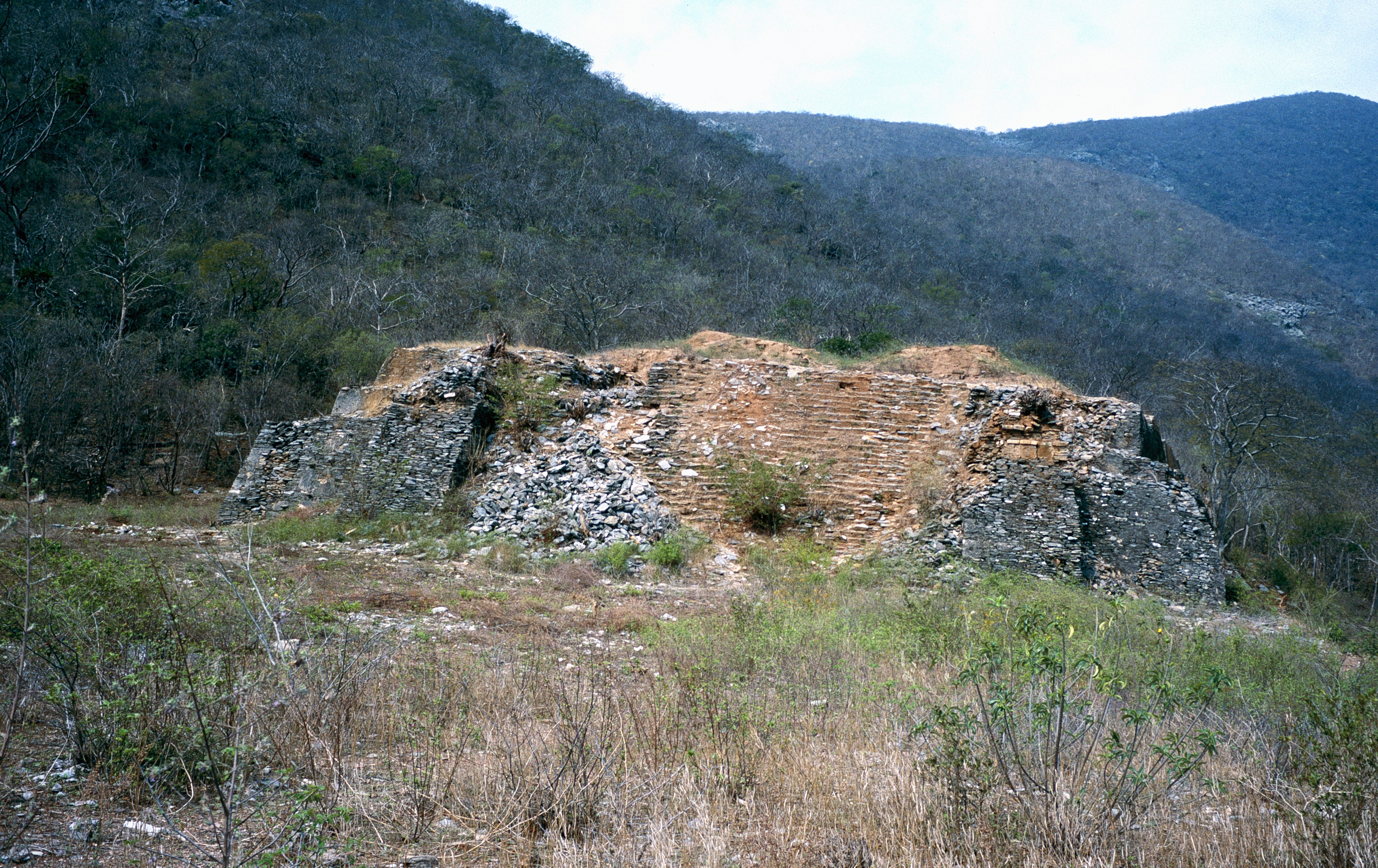
West pyramid of Guiengola

The main archeological site is located on a large hill called Guiengola, Gola, Gui’ngola or Guien-Gola. It and a nearby volcanic cone were fortified with walls, trenches and towers on the slopes. On the summit, terraces, bases, pyramids and temples were constructed with slabs of stone covered in stucco. The fortress city also had pens of deer and wild boar as well as artificial ponds with fish to act as food reserves. The area is filled with small ravines, which makes access more difficult. The fortifications served well in the 1490s, when the Aztecs laid siege to the city, but were unable to definitely conquer it after seven months.

The summit offers a panoramic view of a large part of the area as it extends over the plains. Many of the original walls and other structures remain more than 700 years after they were built. There are some underground chambers. At the top of the hill, there are small pyramids oriented east–west and a type of shrine with circular walls along with a principle residence. The main plaza contains a Mesoamerican ball court facing east. There are also two cylindrical structures which may have been astronomical observatories. The archeological zone is located about twelve km from the modern city along Federal Highway 190. From there a dirt road leads to the hill four km away.

Difficulty of access and hot climate have discouraged study by archeologists. Zapotec fortresses can also be found in Nexapa, Maxaltepec, Quievicuasa, Quiechapa and Quiecolani, which were likely controlled by Tehuantepec.

== Bibliography ==
- Cleary, Edward L.; Timothy j. Steigenga (2004). Resurgent Voice in Latin America: Indigenous Peoples, Political Mobilization, and Religious Change. Port Chester, NY, USA: Rutgers University Press. ISBN 978-0-8135-3461-9.
- DeMott, Tom. (2006). Into the Hearts of the Amazons : In Search of a Modern Matriarchy. Madison, WI, USA: University of Wisconsin Press. ISBN 978-0-299-21640-5.
- Hamnett, Brian R. (2006). Concise History of Mexico. New Brunswick, NJ, USA: Cambridge University Press. ISBN 978-0-521-85284-5.
- Prem, Hanns J. (1997). Ancient Americas : A Brief History & Guide to Research. Salt Lake City, UT, USA: University of Utah Press. ISBN 978-0-87480-536-9.
- Kellogg, Susan (2005). Weaving the Past : A History of Latin America's Indigenous Women from the Prehispanic Period to the Present. Cary, NC, USA: Oxford University Press. ISBN 978-0-19-512381-4.
