= Guiengola =

Archaeological site in Santo Domingo Tehuantepec, Mexico

Guiengola Archaeological site
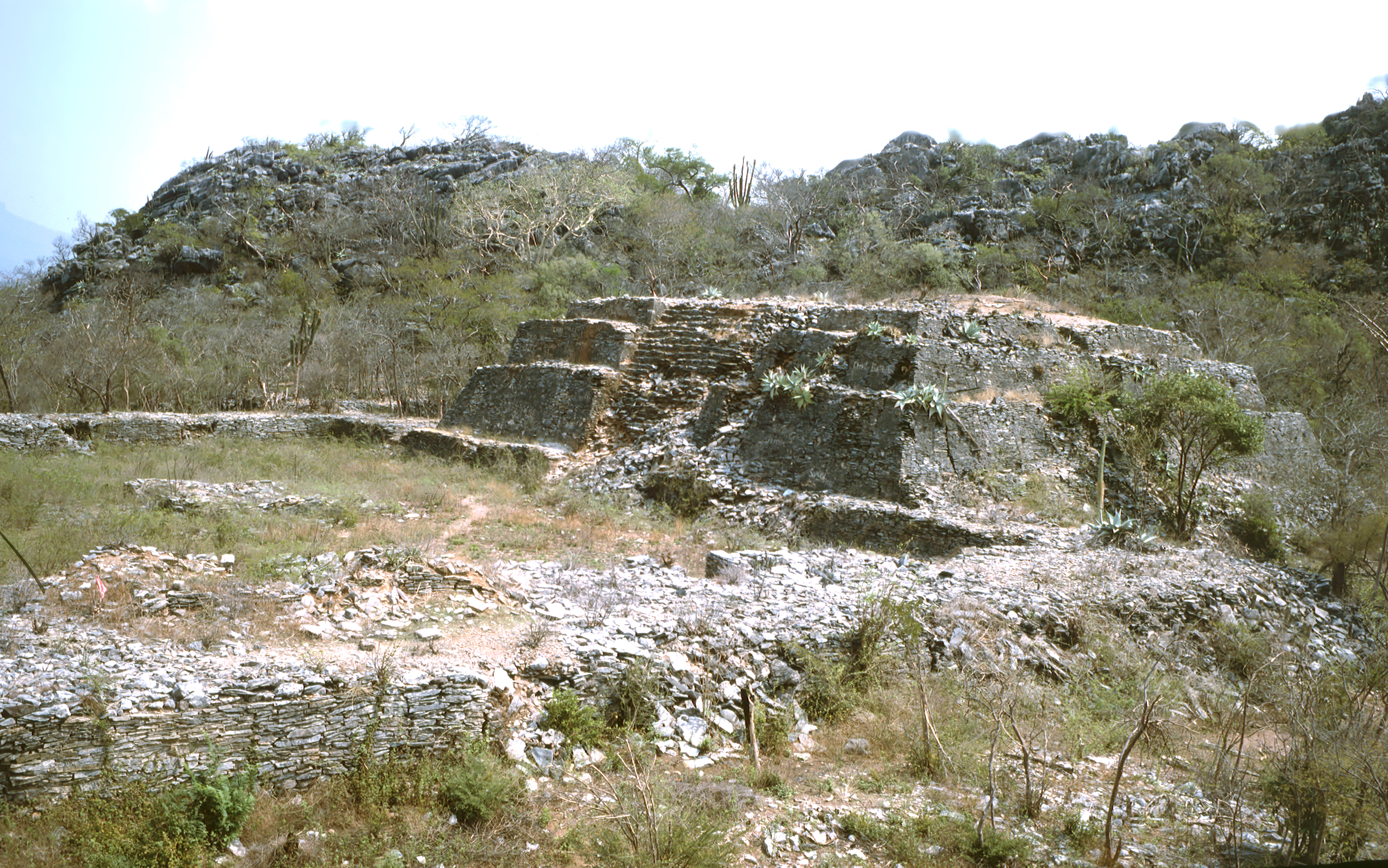
- Guiengola Site
- Interactive map of Guiengola Archaeological site
- 16°23′09″N 95°19′24″W
- Type: Mesoamerican archaeology
- Periods: Mesoamerican Postclassical
- Cultures: Zapotec civilization – Zapotec peoples
- Location: Tehuantepec, Oaxaca, Mexico
- Region: Mesoamerica

History
- Built: 1350 to 1521 CE (Probably earlier)

Site notes
- Website: zona Arqueológica de Guiengola

Map of the Archaeological site of Guiengola, by the Guiengola archaeological project

Guiengola is a Zapotec archeological site located 14 km (8.7 mi) north of Tehuantepec, and 243 km (151 mi) southeast of Oaxaca city on Federal Highway 190. The visible ruins are located between a hill and a river, each carries the name of Guiengola. The name means "large stone" in the local variant of the Zapotec language. There are two main tombs that have been excavated, and both seem to be family interment sites. Both have front chambers that are for religious idols, while the rear chambers are for the burial of important people. The site also has fortified walls, houses, ballgame fields, other tombs and a very large "palace" with remains of artificial ponds and terraces. In the center of the site are 2 plazas, one lower than the other, and 2 pyramids, one to the east and one to the west.

== Background ==
The Zapotec civilization had its beginnings in the Oaxaca valley in the late 6th century BC. The three branches of the valley were divided between 3 different sized societies, separated by 80 km2 "no-man's-land" in the central valley. Archaeological evidence from the period, such as burned temples and sacrificed captives, suggest that the 3 societies were in some sort of competition.

The Oaxaca Valley, the cradle of Zapotec civilization, is a broad valley in the north-eastern part of state of Oaxaca located about 200 km (120 mi) south of Mexico City. Mountains surround the valley with The Sierra Madre Oriental in the north and the mountains of Tlacolula in the southeast. The area's environment is well suited for agriculture, especially the cultivation of maize, making it a desirable place for settlers. The valley floor is mostly flat with large tracts of arable land. At the time of the emergence of Zapotec civilization, the valley soil had not suffered erosion, since the oak–pine forest surrounding the valley was intact. The temperate climate is ideal for maize cultivation, and it possible to harvest crops several times a year. Frost rarely occurs as it does at higher altitudes in the region. The high agricultural potential in The Valley of Oaxaca has certainly contributed to making this area become the locus of the first complex societies in the Valley of Oaxaca.

=== Site investigations ===
Archaeological research has provided clear evidence that Guiengola was a permanent settlement with much more complexity than is given in the ethnohistorical descriptions. Colonial documents only describe Guiengola as a fortress, but previous archaeological projects have revealed public, ceremonial, and residential areas. It is worth mentioning those carried out by Edward Seler, Peterson and MacDougall, and Fernandez Davila. These projects made valuable contributions to our understanding of the site, especially with the documentation of a ceremonial precinct composed of the two largest temples in the settlement; however, without access to modern remote-sensing tools, previous projects were unable to capture the full extension of the site. Guiengola is located in a hard-to-access plateau covered by subtropical dry broadleaf forest, making it logistically challenging to survey. In addition, the canopy makes it nearly impossible to identify architecture with aerial photographs. Investigations by Ramón Celis with airborne lidar scan and archaeological surveys between 2018 and 2023 showed that this settlement was a fortified city of 360 hectares and more than 1000 structures including a walled system of fortifications, an internal road network, and a hierarchically organized city.

=== The name ===
Guiengola is an isthmus Zapotec word that means "Piedra Grande" (Large Stone), from "guie", stone and "ngola", large or old. The site is also known as Danyroó or Large or Old Hill.

=== The Zapotec Culture ===
The name Zapotec is an exonym coming from Nahuatl tzapotēcah (singular tzapotēcatl), which means "inhabitants of the place of sapote". The Zapotec referred to themselves by some variant of the term Be'ena'a, which means "The People."

The Zapotec civilization was a native prehispanic civilization that flourished in the Valley of Oaxaca of southern Mesoamerica. Archaeological evidence shows their culture goes back at least 2500 years. They left archaeological evidence at the ancient city of Monte Albán in the form of buildings, ball courts, magnificent tombs and grave goods including finely worked gold jewelry. Monte Albán was one of the first major cities in Mesoamerica and the center of a Zapotec state that dominated much of what we know of as the current state of Oaxaca.

The Zapotec state formed at Monte Albán began an expansion during the late Monte Alban 1 phase (400 BC – 100 BC) and throughout the Monte Alban 2 phase (100 BC – AD 200). Zapotec rulers began to seize control over the provinces outside the valley of Oaxaca. They could do this during Monte Alban 1c (roughly 200 BC) to Monte Alban 2(200 BC – Ad 100) because none of the surrounding provinces could compete with the valley of Oaxaca both politically and militarily.

In the Aztec capital of Tenochtitlan, there were Zapotec and Mixtec artisans who fashioned jewelry for the Aztec rulers (tlatoanis), including Moctezuma II. Relations with central Mexico go back much further however, as attested by the archaeological remains of a Zapotec neighborhood within Teotihuacan and a Teotihuacan style "guest house" in Monte Albán. Other important pre-Columbian Zapotec sites include Lambityeco, Dainzu, Mitla, Yagul, San José Mogote, El Palmillo and Zaachila.

=== The Zapotec language ===
The Zapotec language belongs to a language family called Oto-manguean, an ancient family of Mesoamerican languages. By 1500 BC the Oto-manguean language began to differ. The Manguean languages probably split first, then the Oto-pamean branch and later the divergence of Mixtecan and Zapotecan languages. The Zapotecan group includes the Zapotec languages and the closely related Chatino. Zapotec languages are spoken in the southwest part of the state of Oaxaca.

Zapotec is a tone language, which means that the meaning of a word is often determined by voice pitch. These tones are essential to understand the meaning of different words. The technical word for it is tonemes. The Zapotec language has several tonemes, in some there are 4 tones; high, low, rising and falling, and in some there are three; high, low and rising.

=== Writing ===
The Zapotecs developed a calendar and a logosyllabic system of writing that used a separate glyph to represent each of the syllables of the language. This writing system is one of several candidates thought to have been the first writing systems of Mesoamerica and the predecessor of the writing systems developed by the Maya, Mixtec, and Aztec civilizations. At the present time, there is some debate as to whether or not Olmec symbols, dated to 650 BC, are actually a form of writing preceding the oldest Zapotec writing dated to about 500 BC.

The writing system of the Zapotec culture is one of the candidates for having been the earliest writing system in Mesoamerica. On a few monuments at Monte Albán archaeologists have found extended text in a glyphic script. Some signs can be recognized as calendric information but the script as such remains undeciphered. Read in columns from top to bottom, its execution is somewhat cruder than that of the later Classic Maya and this has led epigraphers to believe that the script was also less phonetic than the largely syllabic Mayan script. These are, however, speculations.

The earliest known monument with Zapotec writing is a "Danzante" stone, officially known as Monument 3, found in San Jose Mogote, Oaxaca. It has a relief of what appears to be dead and bloodied captive with two glyphic signs between his legs, probably his name. First dated to 500–600 BCE, this was earlier considered the earliest writing in Mesoamerica. However doubts have been expressed as to this dating and the monument may have been reused. The Zapotec script went out of use only in the late Classic period.

== The Site ==
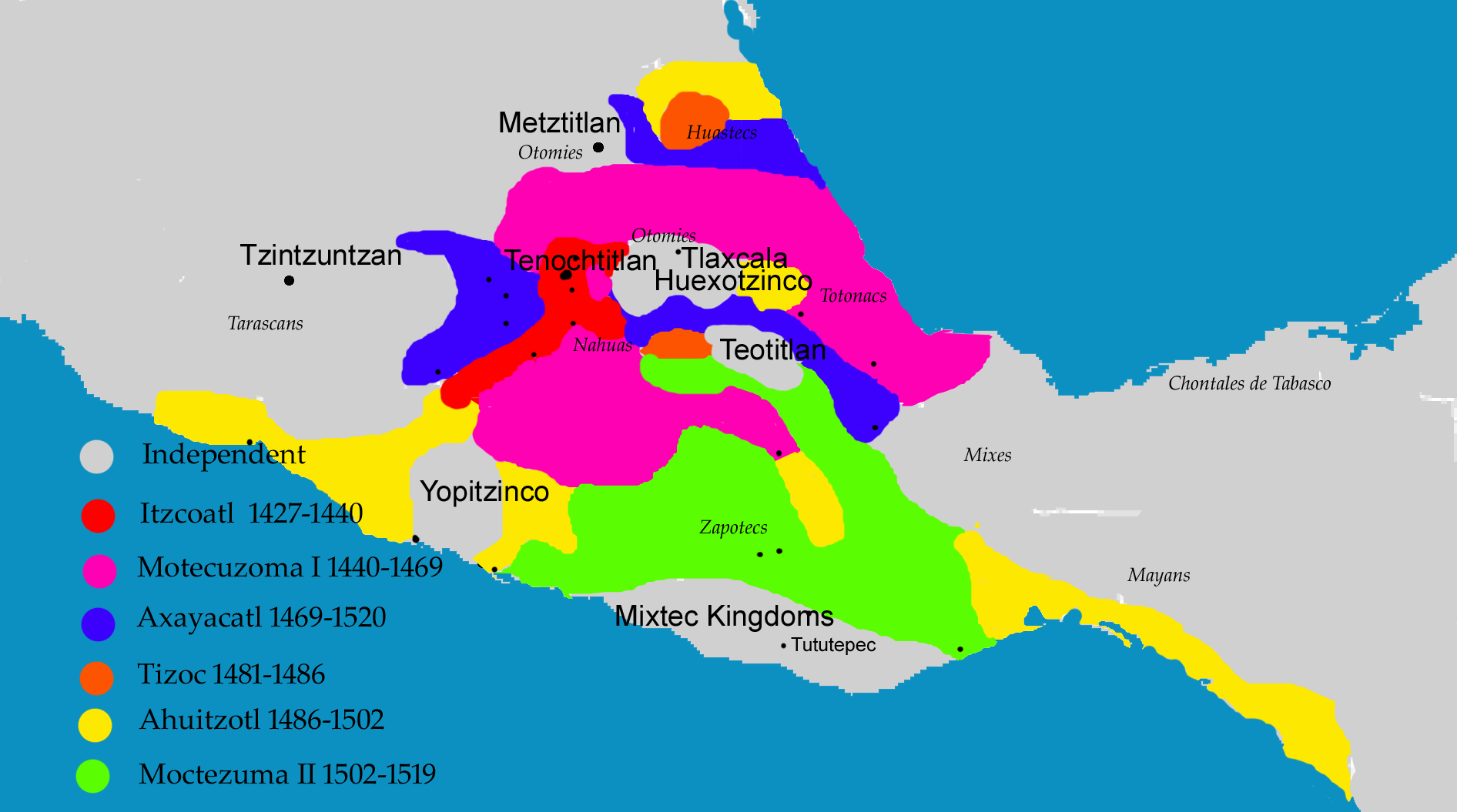
Map showing the expansion of the Aztec empire showing the areas conquered by the Aztec rulers. The conquests of Ahuitzotl are marked in yellow.

The city was constructed in the Post-Classic Mesoamerican period (1350–1521). The site was a Zapotec stronghold against the Aztecs, who never did conquer it.

Apparently the mexicas from Tenochtitlan were seeking tributes and also, control and free access to the Soconusco and Guatemala trade routes.

Cocijoeza and his allies, the Mixteco civilization, resisted the attacks under the Ahuizotl (1486–1502) Aztec Tlatoani leadership.

The emperor of the area at the time was Cocijoeza, who defended it successfully against Ahuizotl, ending hostilities by marrying one of Ahuizotl's daughters.

Ahuizotl's daughter, Coyolicatzin (Cottom meat or white meat, in náhuatl) had a son from that marriage, Cocijopii Who became the last Zapotec King, he was baptized as "Juan Cortés" by the Spaniards and subsequently tried by the Spanish Inquisition on idolatry charges.

While it was abandoned by the Zapotec upon the conquest of the Spanish, the Spaniards never occupied it, leaving the ruins as they were.

From its location, shape and construction system, it is believed Guiengola was a fortified site where Zapotecs guarded and defended against attacks from hostile groups. It is also likely it was an administrative center of the Zapotec isthmus.

=== Structures ===
Guiengola is formed by a ceremonial center on a flat 150 x 200 m surface artificially constructed between two rocky hills. The original access was from the north through a narrow valley. Seler describes the city as a fortress. The flat surface is irregular with three buildings: the west pyramid, the east pyramid and a ballgame court to the south and a residential structure, palace type.

The central nucleus has two sunken plazas, one higher than the other.

All the structures were built with small stone slabs from the area, jointed with mortar and finished with stucco.

=== Eastern Pyramid ===
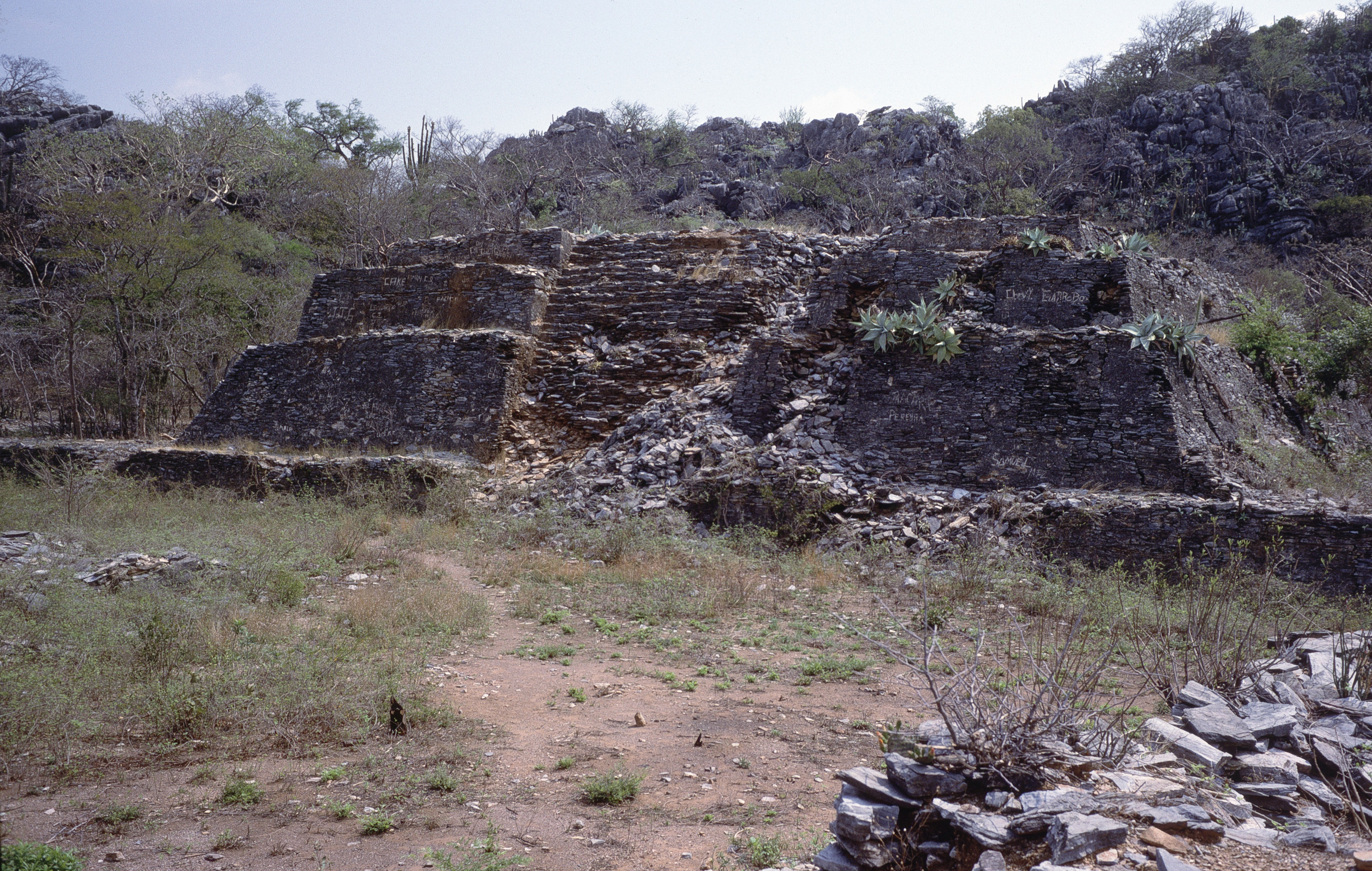
Eastern pyramid

The eastern pyramid building was clearly the most important structure: slightly recessed with 30 × 40 m inner dimensions, built over an older pyramid. The perimeter of the plaza is formed by a 2 m wide and 60 cm high wall. Has a wide stairway to the west. Large and small stairs lead down from the wall in several places, from the ground the pyramid can be. The Eastern pyramid consists of three bodies and in the west side it has an 8 meters stairway that leads to the top; the staircase is embedded in the building. In addition, there are also two narrow stairs on both sides. The actual sanctuary may have been a construction on the pyramid near its eastern wall, whose whole surface was stuccoed.

It faces the Sunken Plaza and in the middle a round altar. The pyramids probably were temples where the priests celebrated rites and ceremonies to their deities; the altars were places where offerings were placed and the plazas where people assembled.

=== West pyramid ===
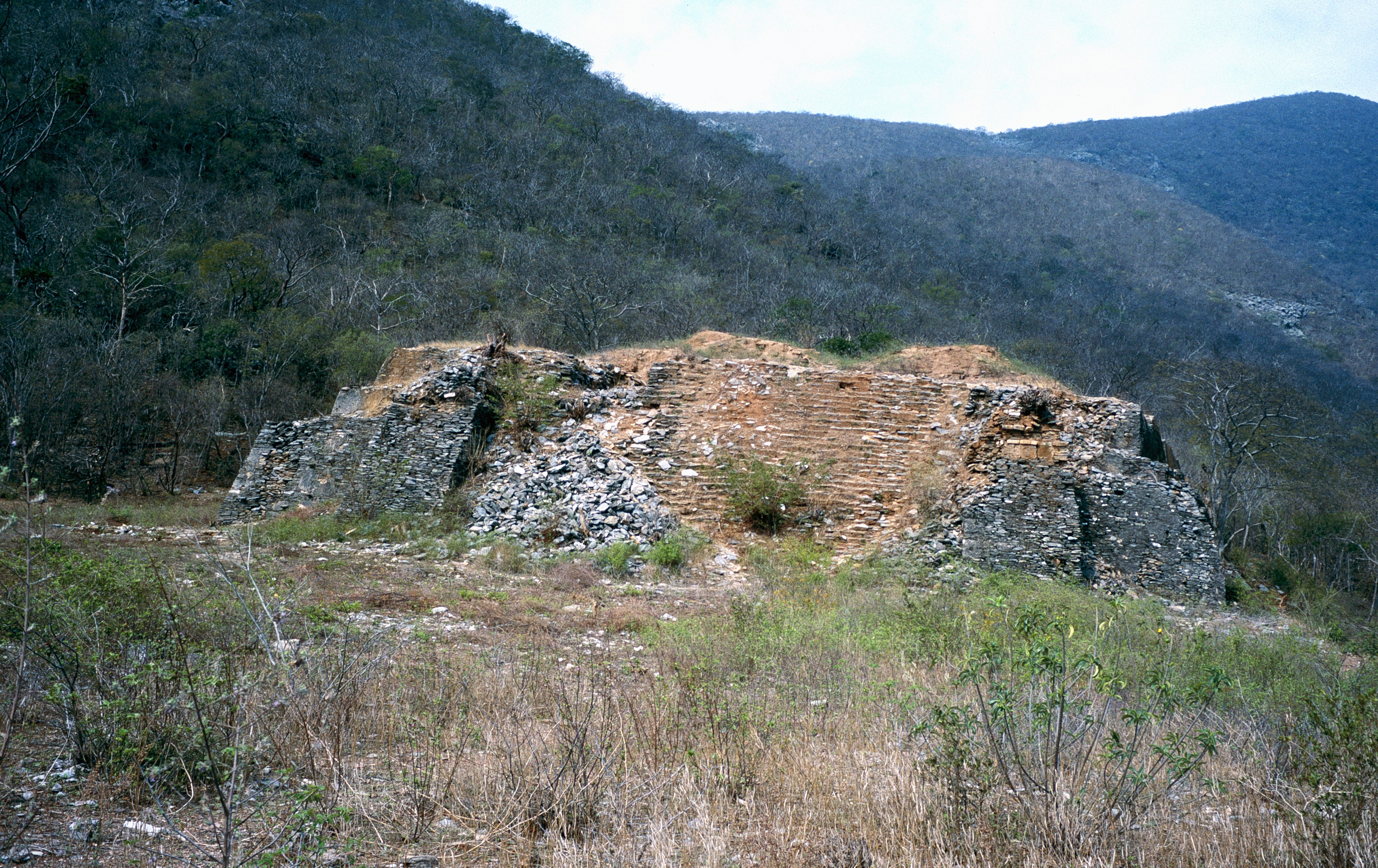
Western pyramid

The Western pyramid is composed of three bodies and in the west has an 8 meters recessed stairway leading to the top, on the top level are remains of an adobe building, behind are other rooms, each measuring almost 13 m.

It faces the sunken plaza and in the middle has a round altar. The pyramids probable were temples where priests held rites and ceremonies to their deities; The altars were places for offering placement and the plazas where people assembled.

=== The Palace ===
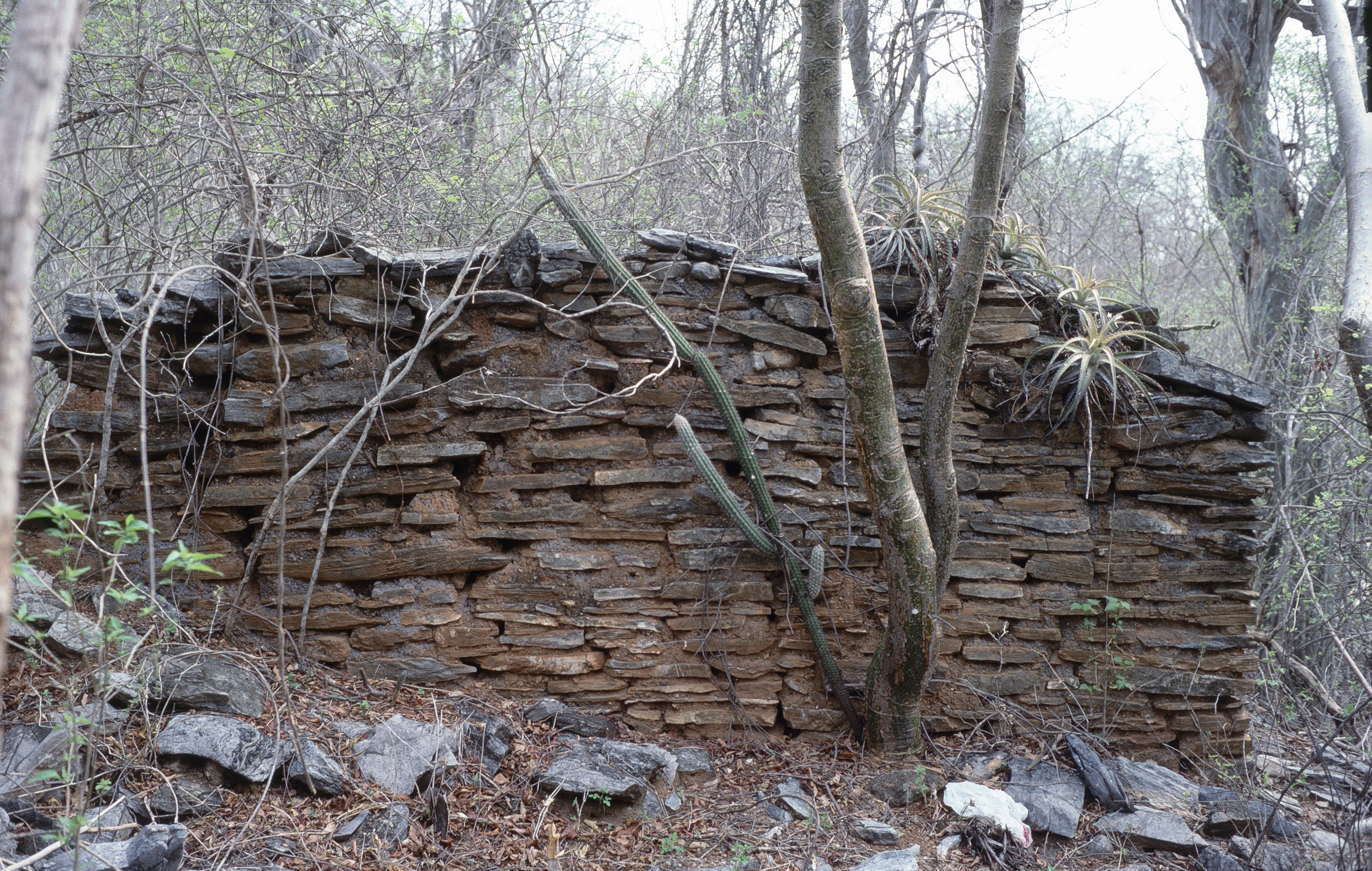
Walls near the Palace area

The Palace or residential complex is on the eastern side. Over several sloped terraces were rooms were built, some with circular columns. There are patios with stairways to communicate among themselves. It contains a round shape lookout built on a natural rock from where a large isthmus territory can be seen.

It is located just 200 m southeast of the ceremonial center and was probably the residence of the ruler Cocijoeza. It consisted of 64 rooms and other structures built on an 11,000 m^{2} area, heavily guarded by the rocky terrain and arranged irregularly. The only access is from the south; there are many large and small stairways, required because of the many elevation differences. A small, irregular patio (patio 11), located in the center of the complex had limited access (via a narrow staircase at the south) is considered the actual residence area. It is a temple with three consecutive differentiated spaces with round typical doors with two columns.

=== Ballgame court ===
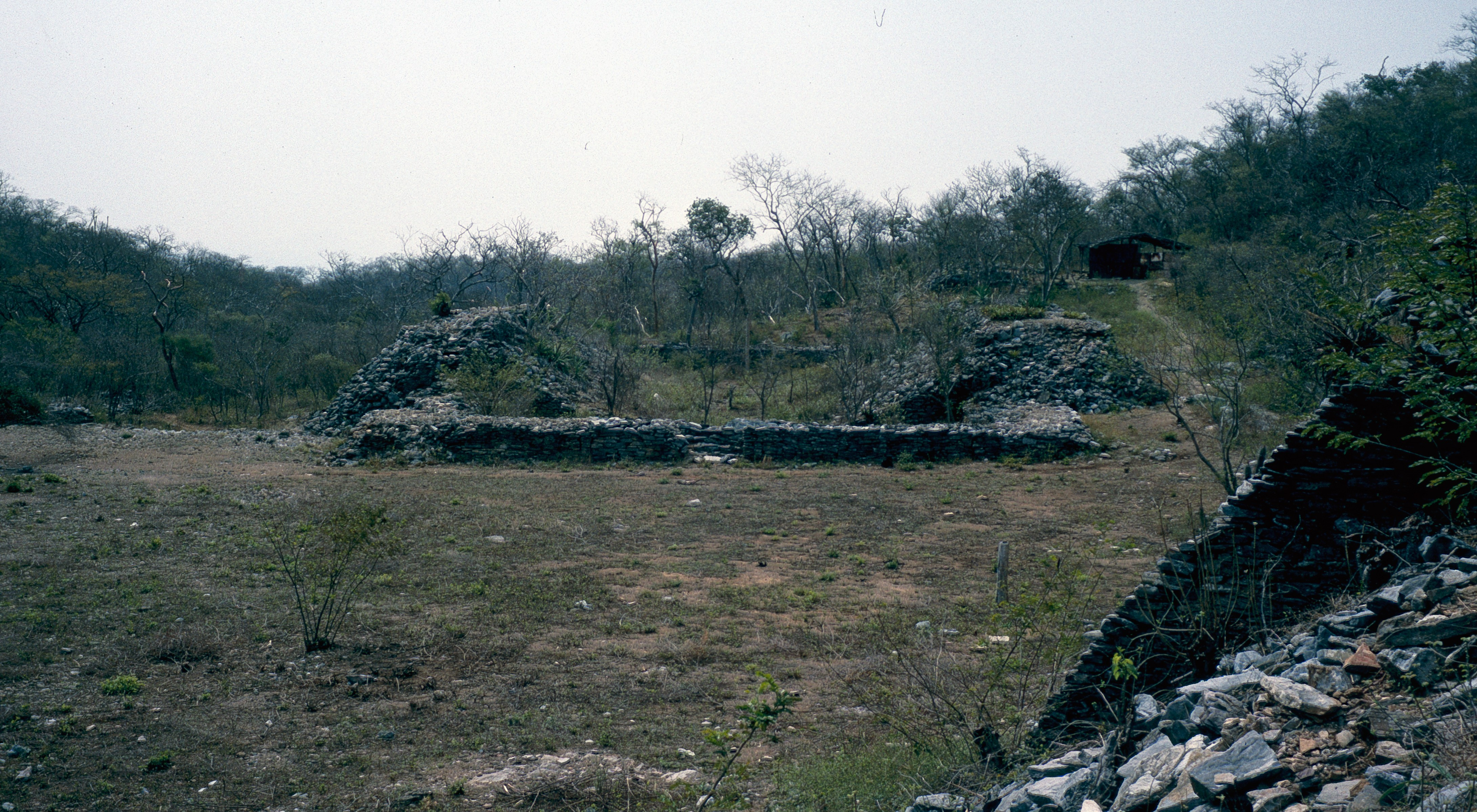
Ballgame Court

The Ball Game Court is located to the east of the Main Plaza, to its left side are other structures, highlighting two with circular form, of which some investigators have suggested were astronomical observatories. The circular rooms have entrances from where they could see some important stars with the intention of measuring the time.

The court is the typical postclassical shape; it is rectangular surrounded by a wall. From the north has two small steps into the court.

=== Outlook ===
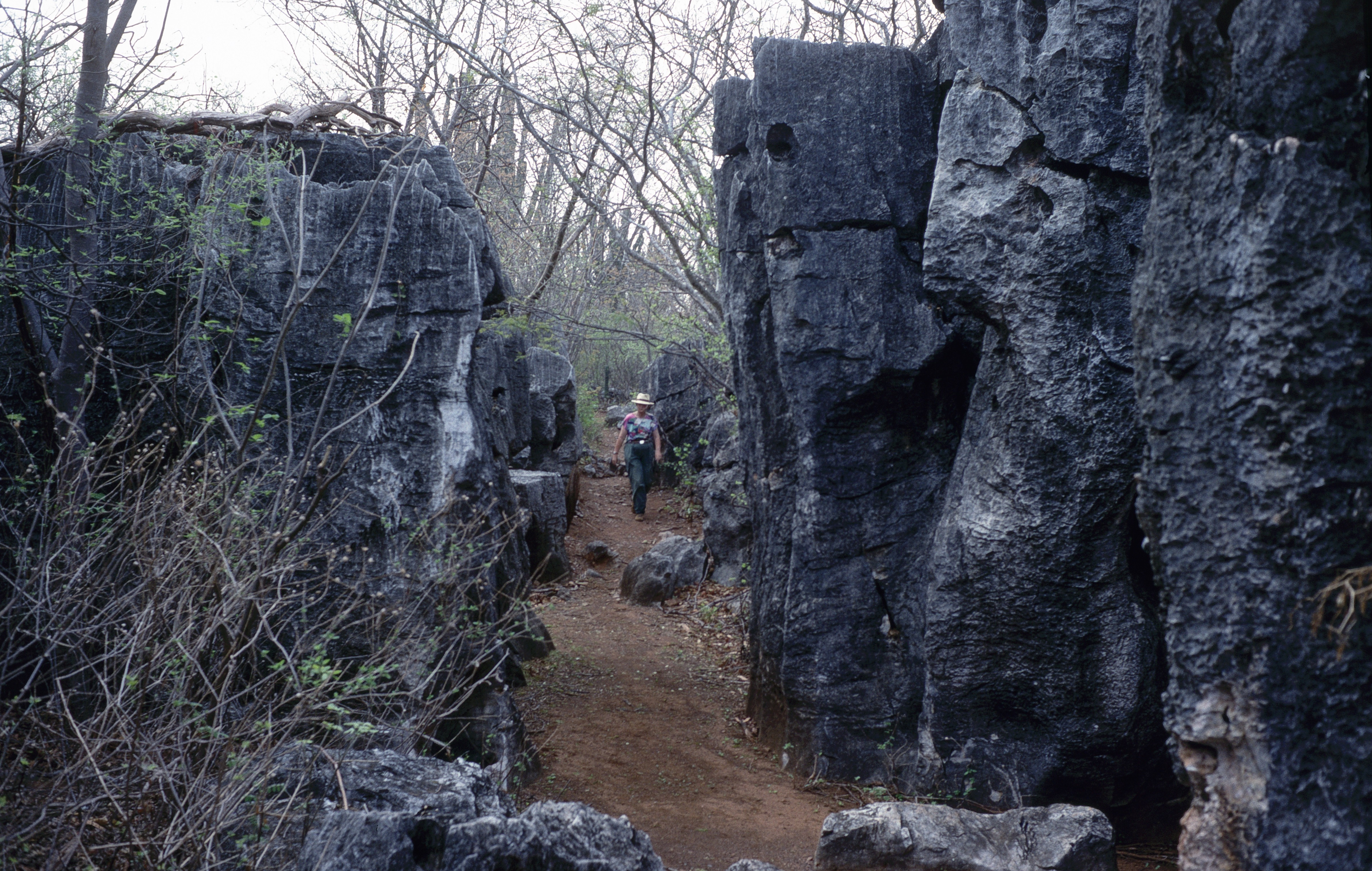
Modern access through rock barriers

The rock barrier had an outstanding value as an outlook, a view point which was erected on a round rock in the eastern side of the palace complex, with a great panoramic view of the valley.

A few mounds or promontories qualify as observatories; from there it is possible to observe any movement in the river basin and has a nearly complete vision of the ceremonial area. On clear days the Pacific Ocean can be seen from there.

=== Tombs ===
Two tombs were already robbed by the 19th century. The first is located next to the encircling wall of the patio of the eastern pyramid. Access from the west leads to a 9 m (30 ft) long and 2 m (6 ft 7 in) wide burial chamber, with two small side chambers. The second tomb located below a small temple with a column in the Palace area. The tomb is smaller and has three parallel chambers. According to colonial information, the large chamber was a sanctuary, while the side chambers, were used several times.

In the northern border of the small valley, at the north-west corner of the sunken Plaza, several cruciform type tombs were located; it is considered a cemetery, due to the large amount of tombs. In almost all the hill there are caves, in some cases accesses are blocked.

=== Caves ===
Because of its proximity to the ceremonial area, one of the caves located at the base of the large rocks, is a ceremonial area with stalactites and stalagmites. It is likely to have contained cave paintings, and its vestiges show an almost total destruction. There are several varied and exciting legends about these caves.

== See also ==
- Zapotec civilization
- Zapotec people
- Zapotec languages
- Tehuantepec
- Oaxaca
- Soconusco

Other Zapotec sites:

- Lambityeco
- Dainzu
- Mitla
- Yagul
- San José Mogote
- El Palmillo
- Zaachila
