= Cosijopii I =

Zapotec king of Zaachila (1502–1563)

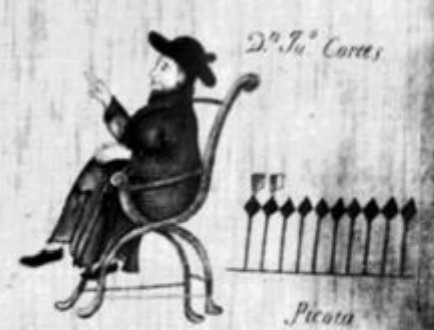
Cosijopii I

Cosijopii I also Cosiiopii I (December 30, 1502–1563) was the last sovereign of the Kingdom of Zaachila, that was named by the Aztecs as Teotzapotlan. Such kingdom was located in the west side of the current Mexican state of Oaxaca and during the last period reached the Pacific coast of the current Chiapas and Guatemala, the Zaachila Kingdom fell after the Spanish colonization. Cosijopii was the son of Cosijoeza, Zapoteca king, and Coyolicaltzin, daughter of Aztec tlatoani Ahuízotl. His siblings were Bitoopa, Natipa, Pinopia, Cosijopi, and Donají.

Cosijopii succeeded his father Cosijoeza to the throne in 1529. Cosijopii moved his capital from Zaachila city to Guiengola at some point in the mid-sixteenth century. His sister, Donají Sicasibí was kidnapped by the Mixtecos and taken to Tehuantepec. He formed an alliance with the Spanish, commanded by Pedro de Alvarado when he arrived in Tehuantepec, and together they fought the Mixtecos. According to the Catholic Encyclopedia, Cosijopii II subsequently "embraced the Catholic Faith," baptized as Juan Cortés Sicasibí.

Between 1543 and 1555 Don Juan Cortés Sicasibí built the Convent of Santo Domingo in Tehuantepec.

Preceded by Cosijoeza	King of Zaachila; 1518–	Succeeded by
