= Zapotec civilization =

Indigenous civilization that flourished in the Valley of Oaxaca in Mesoamerica

Zapotec civilization Be'ena'a (Zapotec)
- c. 700 BC–AD 1521
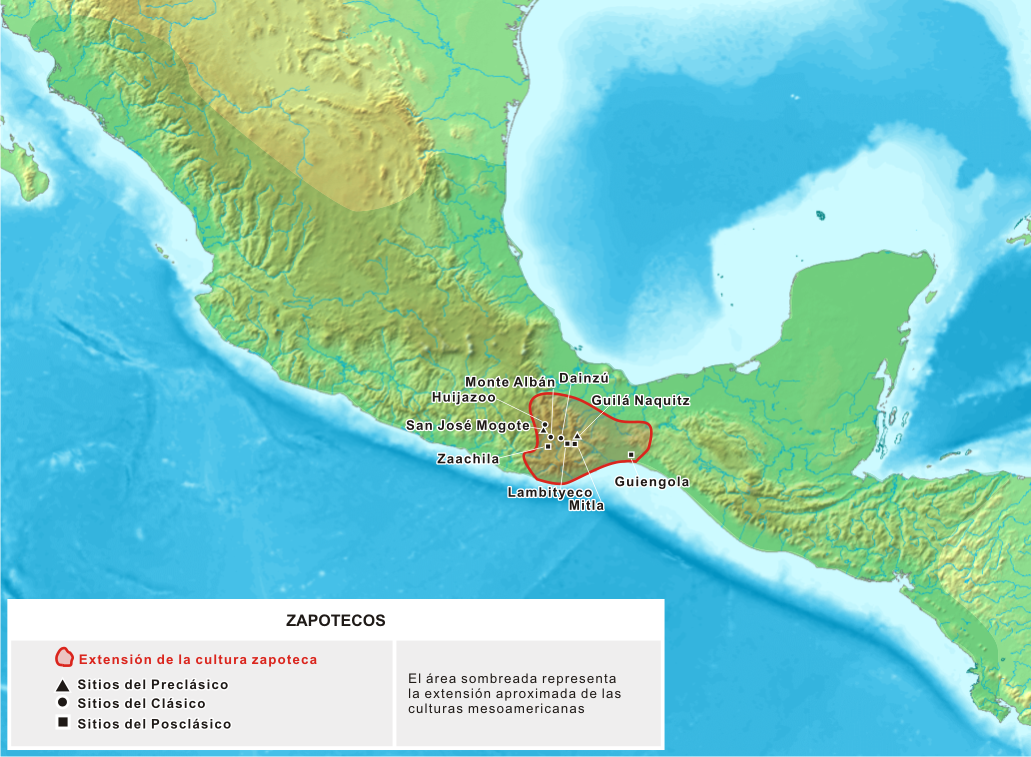
- The Zapotec civilization at its greatest extent
- Status: Zapotec–Mixtec Alliance
- Capital: Monte Albán (700 BC – AD 700); Mitla (de facto) until 1400 (700–1400); Zaachila-Yoo (1400–1521)
- Common languages: Zapotec languages
- Religion: Polytheistic
- Government: Hereditary monarchy
- Monarch
  - 1328–1361: Ozomatli
  - 1361–1386: Huijatoo
  - 1386–1415: Zaachila I
  - 1415–1454: Zaachila II
  - 1454–1487: Zaachila III
  - 1487–1521: Cosijoeza
  - 1518–1563: Cocijopij
- Historical era: Pre-classic – Late post-classic
  - Fall of San José Mogote: c. 700 BC
  - Conflict between Zapotecs and Mixtecs in the empire: 1519–1521
  - Spanish conquest: AD 1521
  - Last Zapotec resistance: 1521–1563
Succeeded by
New Spain
- Today part of: Mexico • Oaxaca

The Zapotec civilization (Be'ena'a (Zapotec) "The People that came from the clouds"; c. 700 BC – AD 1521) is an indigenous pre-Columbian civilization that flourished in the Valley of Oaxaca in Mesoamerica. Archaeological evidence shows that their culture originated at least 2,500 years ago. The Zapotec archaeological site at the ancient city of Monte Albán has monumental buildings, ball courts, tombs and grave goods, including finely worked gold jewelry. Monte Albán was one of the first major cities in Mesoamerica. It was the center of a Zapotec state that dominated much of the territory which today is known as the Mexican state of Oaxaca. The Zapotec peoples are their modern descendants.

== History ==
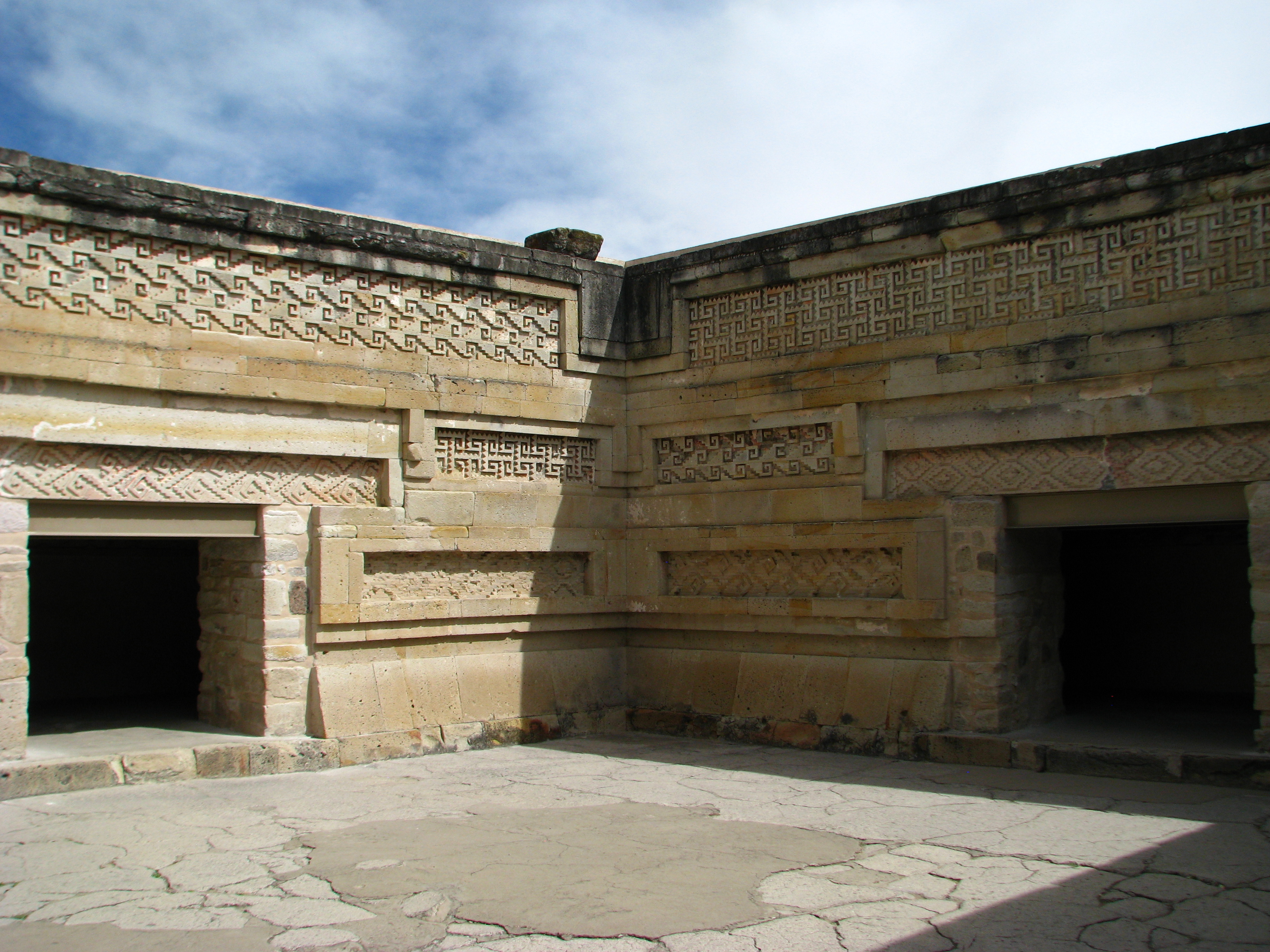
Palace of Columns, Mitla, Oaxaca

Zapotec civilization originated in the Y-shaped Central Valleys of Oaxaca in the late 6th century BC. The three valleys were divided among three differently-sized societies, separated by 80 square kilometres (31 sq mi) "no-man's-land" in the middle. The city of Oaxaca much developed in that area in 1521. Archaeological evidence, such as burned temples and sacrificed war captives, suggests that the three societies competed against each other. At the end of the Rosario phase (700–500 BC), the valley's largest settlement San José Mogote, and a nearby settlement in the Etla Valley, lost most of their population.

During the same period, a new large settlement developed in the "no-man's-land" on top of a mountain overlooking the three valleys; it was later called Monte Albán. Early Monte Albán pottery is similar to pottery from San José Mogote, which suggests that the newer city was populated by people who had left San José Mogote. Although there is no direct evidence in the early phases of Monte Albán's history, walls and fortifications around the site during the archaeological phase Monte Alban 2 (c. 100 BC – AD 200) suggest that the city was constructed in response to a military threat. American archaeologists Joyce Marcus and Kent V. Flannery liken this process to what happened in ancient Greece - synoikism: a centralization of smaller dispersed populations congregated in a central city to meet an external threat.

The Zapotec state formed at Monte Albán began to expand during the late Monte Alban 1 phase (400–100 BC) and throughout the Monte Alban 2 phase (100 BC – AD 200). During Monte Alban 1c (roughly 200 BC) to Monte Alban 2 (200 BC – AD 100), Zapotec rulers seized control of the provinces outside the valley of Oaxaca, because none of the surrounding provinces could compete with them politically and militarily. By 200, the Zapotec had extended their influence, from Quiotepec in the North to Ocelotepec and Chiltepec in the South. Monte Albán had become the largest city in what are today the southern Mexican highlands, and retained this status until approximately AD 700.

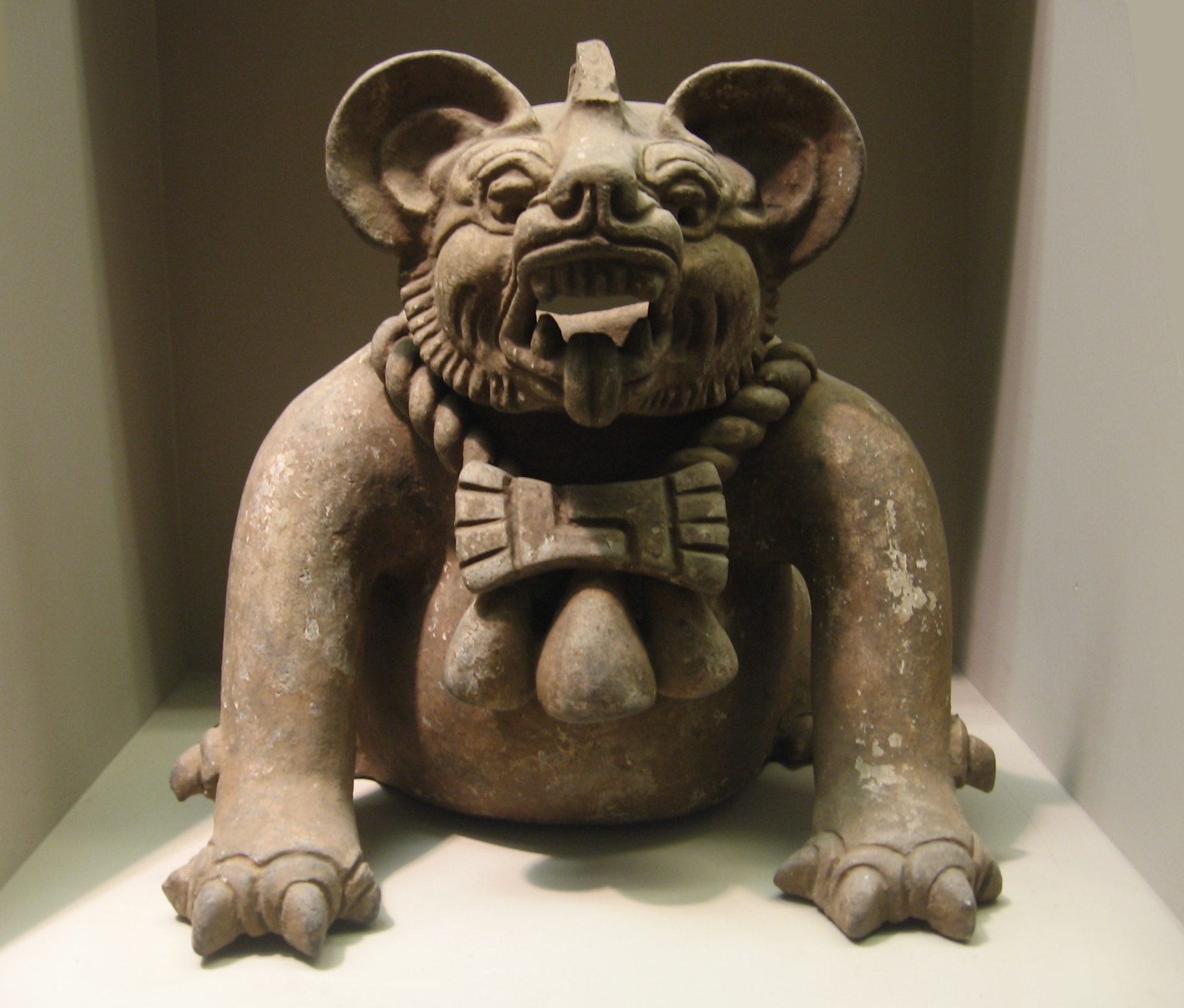
A funerary urn in the shape of a "bat god", from Oaxaca, dated to AD 300–650. Height: 9.5 in (23 cm).

The expansion of the Zapotec empire peaked during the Monte Alban 2 phase. The Zapotec conquered or colonized settlements far beyond The Valley of Oaxaca. Most notably, their influence is visible in the sudden change in style of ceramics made in regions outside the valley. These regions' unique styles were suddenly replaced with Zapotec-style pottery, indicating their integration into the Zapotec empire.

Archaeologist Alfonso Caso, one of the first to conduct excavations in Monte Albán in the 1930s, argued that a building on the main plaza of Monte Albán is further evidence for the dramatic expansion of the Zapotec state: What today is called building J is shaped like an arrowhead, unlike other monumental buildings. It displays more than 40 carved stones with hieroglyphic writing. Archaeologists interpreted the glyphs to represent the provinces controlled by the Zapotec. Each glyph group also depicts a head, with an elaborate head dress, carved into the slabs. These are assumed to represent the rulers of the provinces. Heads turned upside down are believed to represent the rulers killed and whose provinces were taken by force, while the upright ones may represent those who did not resist annexation and had their lives spared. For this reason, building J is also referred to by archeologists as “The Conquest Slab”.

Marcus and Flannery write about the subsequent dramatic expansion of the Monte Albán state, noting when there is

"a great disparity in populations between the core of a state and its periphery, it may only be necessary for the former to send colonists to the latter. Small polities, seeing that resistance would be futile, may accept a face-saving offer. Larger polities unwilling to lose their autonomy may have to be subdued militarily. During the expansion of Monte Alban 2 state, we think we see both colonization and conquest".

=== Warfare and resistance ===
The 1450s saw the Aztec forces invading the Valley of Oaxaca in a bid to extend hegemony over the area. The area was conquered by the Aztecs in 1458. In 1486, the Aztec established a fort on the hill of Huaxyácac (now called El Fortín), which they used to enforce the collection of tribute payments in Oaxaca. The last battle between the Aztecs and the Zapotecs occurred between 1497–1502, under the Aztec ruler Ahuizotl in the battle of Guiengola, a fortified city in the Isthmus of Tehuantepec. At the time of Spanish conquest of the Aztec Empire, when news arrived that the Aztecs were defeated by the Spaniards, King Cosijoeza ordered his people not to confront the Spaniards so they would avoid the same fate. The Zapotec sent a delegation to seek an alliance with the Spaniards.

On November 25, 1521, Francisco de Orozco arrived in Valley of Oaxaca, with both the Zapotecs and Mixtecs in the area soon submitting to the rule of Hernan Cortes. According to historian William B. Taylor, "Peaceful conquest spared the Valley of Oaxaca the loss of life and the grave social and psychological dislocations experienced by the Aztecs in the Valley of Mexico." However, de Orozco did meet with some resistance in Antequera, which was subdued by the end of 1521.

=== Viceroyalty ===
After 1526, the Zapotec territory became part of the Marquessate of the Valley of Oaxaca of the Viceroyalty of New Spain, under the control of Hernan Cortéz.

Starting in 1528, Dominican friars established permanent residence in Antequerea. After the Bishopric of Oaxaca was formally established in 1535, Catholic priests arrived in ever-increasing numbers. Settlers arriving from Spain brought with them domestic animals that had hitherto never been seen in Oaxaca: horses, cows, goats, sheep, chickens, mules and oxen.

During the viceroyalty, there was a process of miscegenation ("Mestizaje") between the native population and Spanish settlers, which would continue for centuries after the formation of the state of Mexico. Many of these descendants would retain the Mixtec language as a reminder of their ancestry into the present day.

In the decades following the Spanish encounter, a series of devastating epidemics wreaked havoc on the native population of Oaxaca and other parts of Mexico. Before the first century had ended, some nineteen major epidemics had come and gone.

The exposure of the Oaxacan Indians to smallpox, chicken pox, diphtheria, scarlet fever, measles, typhoid, mumps, influenza, and cocoliztli (a hemorrhagic disease) took a huge toll. As a result, Ms. Romero has written that the native population declined from 1.5 million in 1520 to 150,000 people in 1650. But, over time, the population of Oaxaca rebounded.

=== Modern Period ===
In the 2000 census, the Mixteco Indians in Oaxaca numbered 241,383, or 55.19% of the 437,373 Mixtecos in the entire Mexican Republic. Including the various subsidiary Mixtec languages, the total Mixtec-speaking population of the Mexican Republic in 2000 included 444,498 individuals. Today, the Mixtecs are spread throughout the entire nation, in large part because of their good reputation in the agricultural industry. Indigenous speakers from Oaxaca have also made their way to the United States in large numbers.

=== Archaeological finds ===
In January 2026, a well-preserved 1,400-year-old Zapotec tomb was discovered in Oaxaca during an investigation by the National Institute of Anthropology and History (INAH). There is a large frieze of an owl head decorating the entrance to the burial chamber, with the bird's beak curving over the painted stucco face of a Zapotec lord, symbolizing the connection between the deceased and the underworld. The interior contains rare polychrome murals depicting a procession of figures carrying bags of copal, along with stone-carved guardians at the threshold.

== Etymology ==
The name Zapotec is an exonym; they were referred to by Nahuatl speakers as tzapotēcah (singular tzapotēcatl), which means "inhabitants of the place of sapote". The Zapotec referred to themselves by some variant of the term Be'ena'a, which means "The Cloud People".

== Language ==
Archaeological phases of Monte Albán history
Phase	Period
Monte Alban 1	c. 400–100 BC
Monte Alban 2	c. 100 BC – AD 100
Monte Alban 3	c. 200-900
Monte Alban 4	c. 900–1350
Monte Alban 5	c. 1350–1521

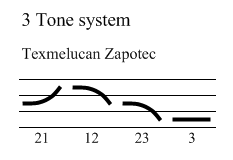
the tone system of Texmelucan Zapotec.

The Zapotec languages belong to a language family called Oto-Manguean, an ancient family of Mesoamerican languages. It is estimated that today's Oto-manguean languages branched off from a common root at around 1500 BC. The Manguean languages probably split off first, followed by the Oto-pamean branch while the divergence of Mixtecan and Zapotecan languages happened later still. The Zapotecan group includes the Zapotec languages and the closely related Chatino. Zapotec languages are spoken in parts of the Northern Sierra, the Central Valleys as well as in parts of the Southern Sierra, in the Isthmus of Tehuantepec and along parts of the Pacific Coast. Due to decades of out-migration, Zapotec is also spoken in parts of Mexico City and Los Angeles, CA. There are 7 distinct Zapotec languages and over 100 dialects.

Zapotec is a tone language, which means that the meaning of a word is often determined by voice pitch (tonemes), essential for understanding the meaning of different words. The Zapotec languages features up to 4 distinct tonemes: high, low, rising and falling.

== Society ==
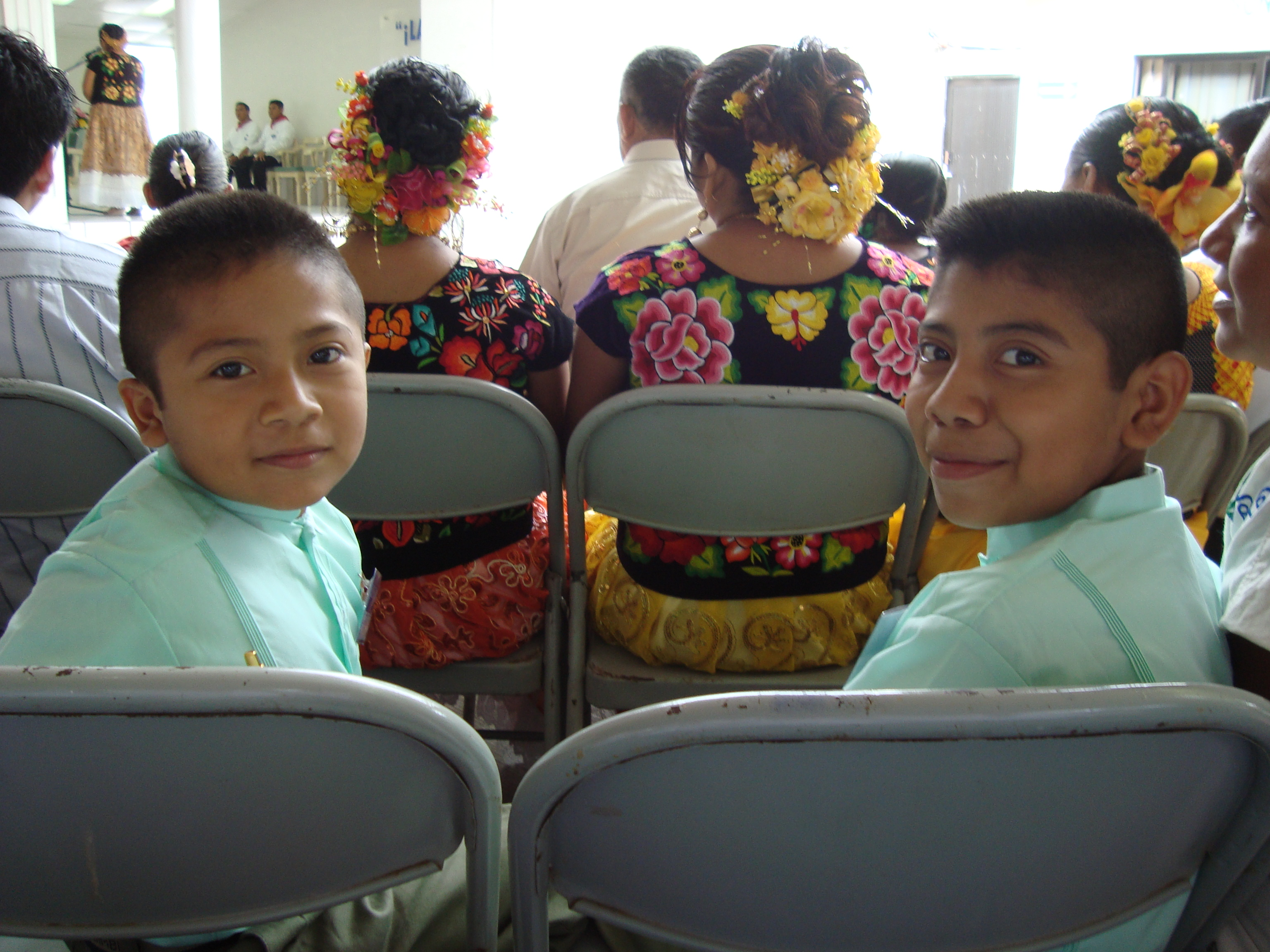
Contemporary Zapotec people.

Between Monte Alban phases 1 and 2 there was a considerable expansion of the population of the Valley of Oaxaca. As the population grew, so did the degree of social differentiation, the centralization of political power, and ceremonial activity. During Monte Alban 1-2 the valley appears to have been fragmented into several independent states, as manifested in regional centers of power. By Monte Alban phase 3, the fragmentation between the city and the valleys resulted in a swell in the population and urban development of Monte Albán itself.

== Geography ==
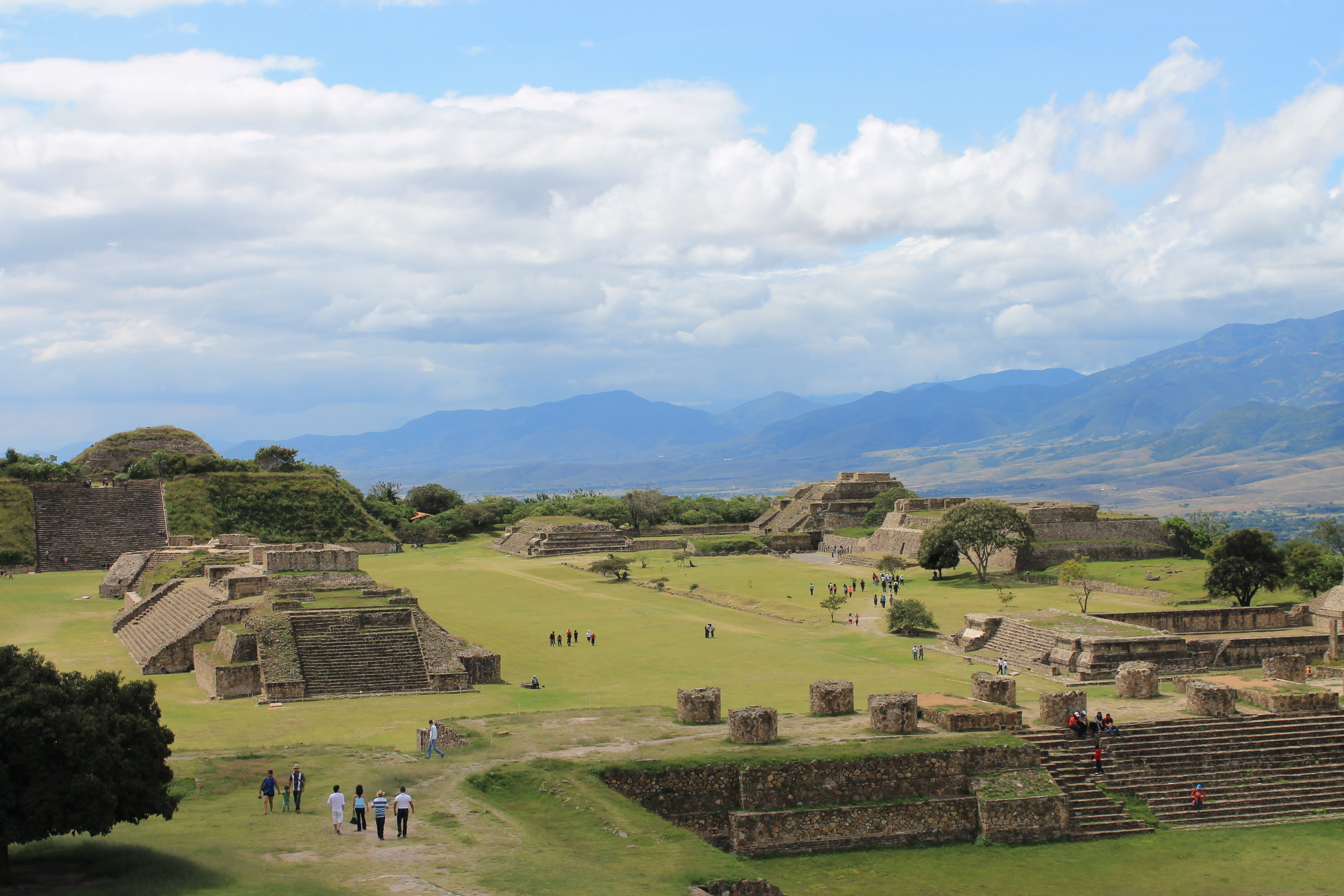
Looking over the site of Monte Albán. Situated on a mountaintop, Monte Albán overlooks much of the Valley of Oaxaca.

The Central Valleys of Oaxaca, the cradle of Zapotec civilization, are three broad valleys—Etla in the west, Ocotlán in the south and Mitla in the east—that join at an altitude of about 4500 feet above sea level in the center of what today is the state of Oaxaca. They are located about 200 km south of Mexico City. Mountains surround the valley with The Sierra Norte in the north and the mountains of Tlacolula in the southeast. The environment is well suited for agriculture and is considered one of the cradles of maize. It is estimated that at the time of the emergence of Zapotec civilization, the valley soil were unaffected by the erosion seen today, as the oak and pine forests covering the surrounding mountains had not yet been decimated by logging. There is a dry season from November until May but along the rivers it is possible to plant and harvest crops twice. The mountains are traversed from north-west to south by the Atoyac River which provides water for a small strip of land bordering the river, when it periodically floods. To provide water for crops elsewhere in the valley away from the river, the Zapotecs used canal irrigation. By using water from small streams, the Zapotecs were able to bring water to Monte Albán, situated 400 meters above the valley floor. Archaeologists found remains of a small irrigation system consisting of a dam and a canal on the south-eastern flank of the mountain. As this would not have been enough to support all the population of Monte Albán, it is assumed that there were many other irrigation systems. Likewise, crops grown in the valley were not enough to sustain the rapid population growth in the Monte Albán I phase. Therefore, crops were grown on the foothills where the soil is a less fertile and artificial irrigation was needed.

Innovation of farming enabled the Zapotec to pay tribute to the Spanish conquerors and create enough surplus to feed themselves despite natural disasters and disease.

== Technology ==
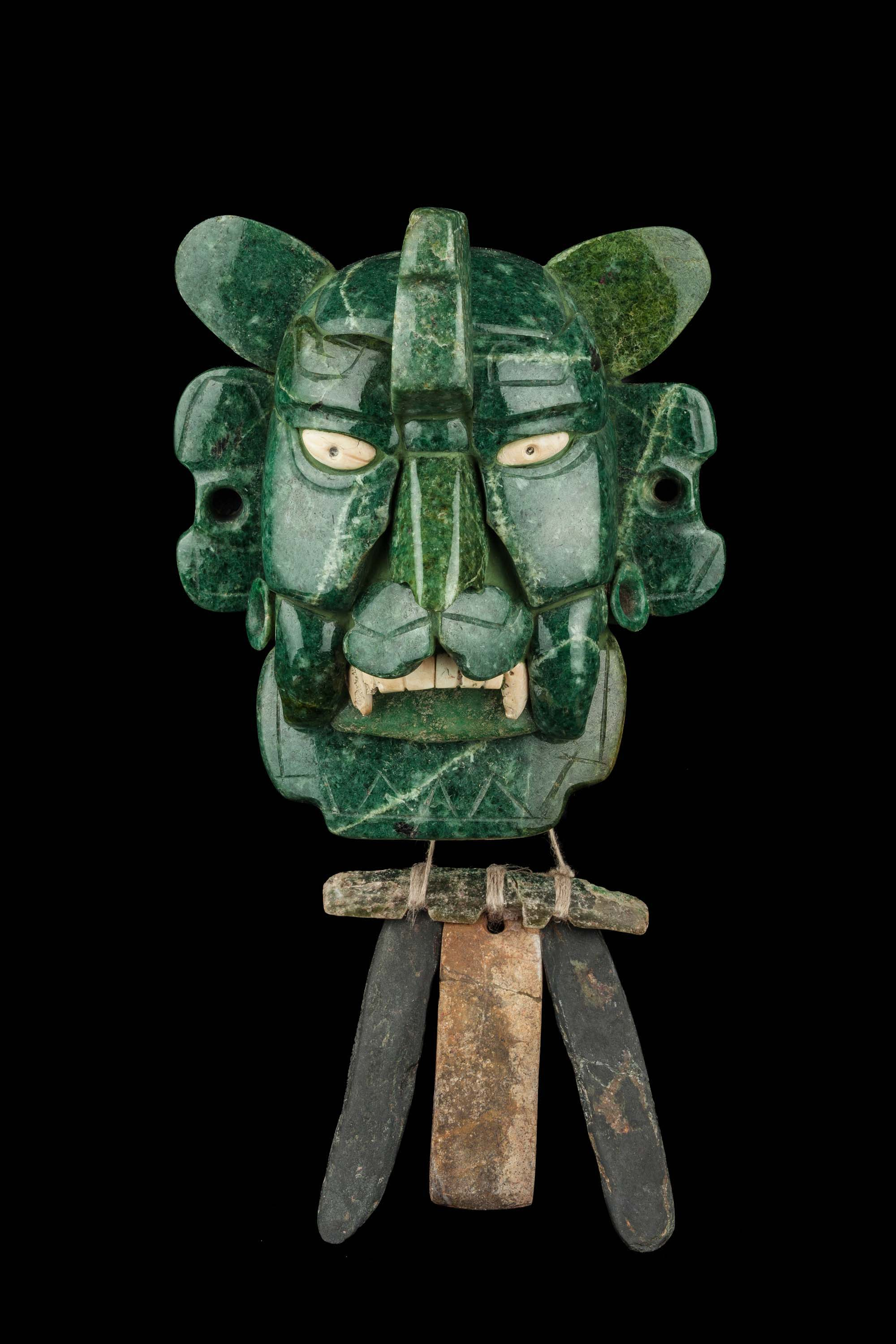
Zapotec mosaic mask that represents a "bat god", made of 25 pieces of jade, with yellow eyes made of shell. It was found in a tomb at Monte Albán

The Zapotecs developed a calendar (see Mesoamerican calendars#Comparison of calendars by culture) and a logosyllabic system of writing that used a separate glyph to represent each of the syllables of the language. This writing system is thought to be one of the first writing systems of Mesoamerica and a predecessor of those developed by the Maya, Mixtec and Aztec civilizations. There is debate as to whether Olmec symbols, dated to 650 BC, are actually a form of writing preceding the oldest Zapotec writing dated to about 500 BC.

In the Aztec capital of Tenochtitlan, there were Zapotec and Mixtec artisans who fashioned jewelry for the Aztec rulers (tlatoanis), including Moctezuma II. However, relations with central Mexico go back much further, as suggested by the archaeological remains of a Zapotec neighborhood within Teotihuacan and a Teotihuacan style "guest house" in Monte Albán. Other important pre-Columbian Zapotec sites include Lambityeco, Dainzú, Mitla, Yagul, San José Mogote, El Palmillo and Zaachila.

The Zapotecs were a sedentary culture living in villages and towns, in houses constructed with stone and mortar. They recorded the principal events in their history by means of hieroglyphics, and in warfare they made use of a cotton armour. The well-known ruins of Mitla have been attributed to them.

== Writing ==
At Monte Albán archaeologists have found extended text in a glyphic script. Some signs can be recognized as calendar information but the script as such remains undeciphered. Read in columns from top to bottom, its execution is somewhat cruder than that of the later Classic Maya and this has led epigraphers to believe that the script was also less phonetic than the largely syllabic Mayan script.

The earliest known artifact with Zapotec writing is a Danzante ("dancer") stone, officially known as Monument 3, found in San José Mogote, Oaxaca. It has a relief of what appears to be a dead and bloodied captive with two glyphic signs between his legs, possibly his name. First dated to 500–600 BC, this was initially considered the earliest writing in Mesoamerica. However, doubts have been expressed as to this dating as the monument may have been reused. The Zapotec script appears to have gone out of use in the late Classic period.

== Religion and myth ==
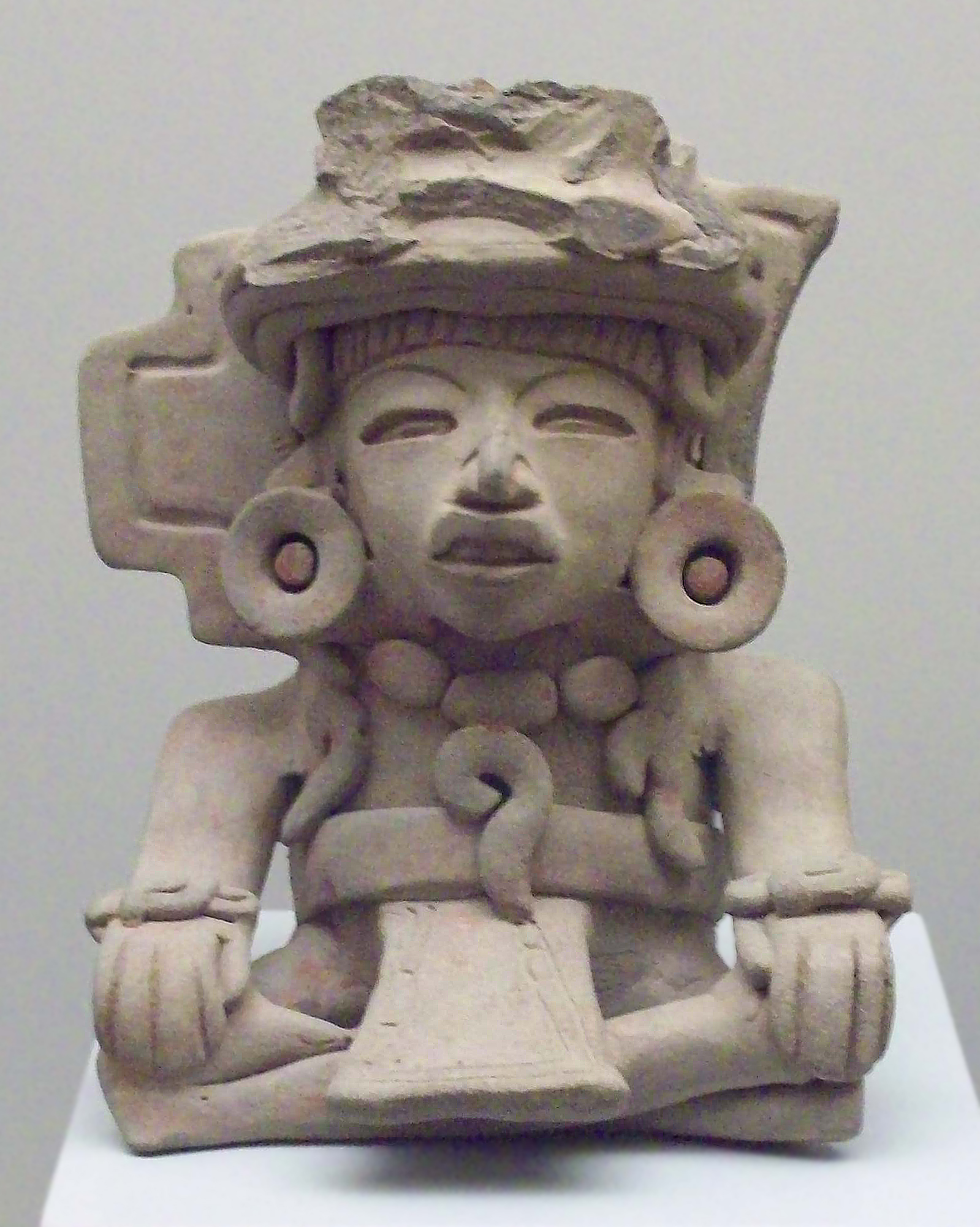
Painted ceramic funerary urn depicting a seated figure. Zapotec culture (phase Monte Albán III), Early and Middle Classic Period (AD 100-700). Mexico.

Like most Mesoamerican religious systems, the Zapotec religion was polytheistic. Some known deities were Cocijo, the rain god (similar to the Aztec god Tlaloc); Coquihani, the god of light; and Pitao Cozobi, the god of maize. Zapotec deities were predominantly associated with fertility or agriculture. Both male and female deities are represented, differentiated by costume. Males are depicted wearing breechclouts with or without capes, while females are depicted wearing skirts. There is some evidence of worship of deities not directly associated with Zapotec culture, such as the Teotihuacan Feathered Serpent, Butterfly God, and rain god; and the Nahuatl god of spring Xipe Totec. It is believed that the Zapotec used human sacrifice in some of their rituals.

There are several legends of the origin of the Zapotec. One of them is that they were the original people of the valley of Oaxaca and were born from rocks, or descended from big cats such as pumas, jaguars and ocelots. Another is that the Zapotec settled in the Oaxaca valley after founding the Toltec empire, and were descendants of the people of Chicomoztoc. These legends were not transcribed until after the Spanish conquest.

According to historical and contemporary Zapotec legends, their ancestors emerged from the earth, from caves, or turned into people from trees or jaguars. Their governing elite believed that they descended from supernatural beings who lived among the clouds, and that upon death they would return to the clouds. The name by which Zapotecs are known today results from this belief. The Zapotecs of the Central Valleys call themselves "Be'ena' Za'a" - The Cloud People.

=== Dedication rituals ===
The Zapotec used dedication rituals to sanctify their living spaces and structures. Excavation of Mound III at the Cuilapan Temple Pyramid in Oaxaca revealed a dedication cache containing many jade beads, two jade earspools, three obsidian blades, shells, stones, a pearl, and small animal bones, likely from birds, dated to AD 700. Each of these materials symbolized different religious concepts. As it was not easily attainable, jade was valued, and worked jade even more so because the elite were the primary artists. Obsidian blades are associated with sacrifice, as they were commonly used in bloodletting rituals. Shells and pearl represent the underworld, being from the ocean, and the small bird bones represent the sky and its relation to the balanced cosmos. These artifacts are significant due to their placement in a structure used for ritual and associated with power. This cache is a form of dedication ritual, dedicating the Cuilapan Temple Pyramid to these ideas of power, sacrifice, and the relationship between underworld and cosmos.

=== Deities ===
The following list was assembled by Michael Lind by consulting various colonial-era sources. Note that some deities have multiple names, as well as multiple historical spellings and dialectal variants. Note also that "Pitao" is simply the word for god.

Deity	Domain
Liraa Quitzino	principal god
Pitao Cozaana	Creator deity; god of hunting and animals
Pitao Huichana	Creator deity; patron goddess of women and children
Pitao Copiycha	god of sun
Cociyo	god of rain
Pitao Cozobi	god of maize; harvests
Pitao Peeze	god of omens; patron of sorcerers and thieves
Pitao Paa	god of merchants, wealth, good fortune, happiness
Pitao Ziy	god of misery, loss, misfortune, unhappiness
Pitao Xoo	god of earthquakes
Pixee Pezeelao	god of the underworld
Xonaxi Quecuya	goddess of the underworld

Huetexi Pea, the god who measured the world, may have been the same figure as Liraa Quitzino. Pitao Xicala (god of dreams) and Pixee Pecala (god of love and lechery) may have been aspects of Pitao Peeze. Coquihuani may have been a name for Pitao Copiycha. Deification of local rulers also appears to have been a common practice. Other deities include Cozichacozee (god of war), Coqui Lao (god of turkey hens), and Leraa Queche (god of medicine).
