= Cosijoeza =

King of Zaachila

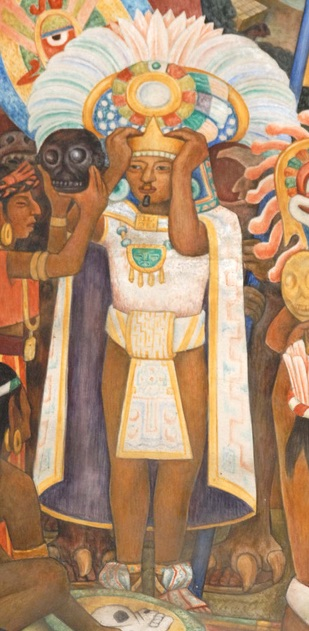
- Detail of the mural "Civilización mixteco-zapoteca" by Diego Rivera where there is a Coquitao with possible features similar to Cosijoeza.

4th Coquitao of Kingdom of Zaachila
- In office 1487–1529
- Preceded by: Zaachila III
- Succeeded by: Cosijopii

Personal details
- Born: c. 1450 Zaachila, Kingdom of Zaachila
- Children: Cosijopii; Pinopiaa

Guxi Chikoeza, also spelled Kosi'ioeza, (c. 1450–1529) was a coquitao (king) of Zaachila. His name means "Storm of obsidian knives" or "time of obsidian knives" in Zapotec. The Aztecs referred to him as Huizquiauitl. He ascended the throne in 1487, faced two invasions from the Aztec Empire, and built the city of Guiengola.

The kingdom of Zaachila possessed a strategic location between the highlands of the Valley of Mexico and the Maya lands of what is now Chiapas and Guatemala, as well as important industries of salt production, goldsmithing and cochineal dye, and this geopolitical importance attracted the interest of the Aztecs. In an attempt to counter the Aztec threat, in 1494 King Guxi Chikoeza ordered the Aztec spies in his territory killed. The Aztec tlatoani Ahuitzotl took these murders as a casus belli and launched an invasion in 1497. The city of Huaxyacac was the first to be attacked and destroyed by the Aztecs, followed by Mitla, the Isthmus of Tehuantepec and Soconusco. Faced with a difficult situation, Guxi Chikoeza requested aid from the Mixtec king Dzahuindanda, who accepted the alliance and supplied 24,000 warriors that joined the 36,000 of Zaachila's army, and the combined forces succeeded in expelling the Aztecs.

In 1497, Ahuitzotl again attacked the allied Zapotec and Mixtec kingdoms and sent the Tlacateccatl (general) to the bastion that represented Guiengola, beginning a siege that lasted 7 months. Ahuitzotl then proposed a peace treaty to Guxi Chikoeza in which he included the hand of his daughter, the princess Xilabela. From this union, princes Cosiiopii II and Pinopiaa were born.

Upon his death, Kosi'ioeza was buried in the city of Zaachila, a place where it was customary to bury the Zapotec sovereigns.

Preceded by Zaachila III	King of Zaachila; 1487–1504	Succeeded by Cosijopii
