= El Palmillo =

Archaeological site in Oaxaca, Mexico

El Palmillo is a Mesoamerican Classic Period archaeological site located in the Valley of Oaxaca, associated with the pre-Columbian Zapotec civilization which was centered in the valley and the surrounding highlands of the present-day state of Oaxaca, Mexico. Located on a hilltop in the eastern Tlacolula arm of the valley, El Palmillo is just to the south of the pre-Columbian site of Mitla and to the east of the major Zapotec regional center, Monte Albán.

A major excavation at the site has been ongoing since 1999, led by Dr. Gary Feinman and Linda Nicholas of the Field Museum of Natural History.
