= Regional communications in ancient Mesoamerica =

Formative Era sites of Mesoamerica

Regional communications in ancient Mesoamerica are believed to have been extensive. There were various trade routes attested since prehistoric times. In this article, especially the routes starting in the Mexico Central Plateau, and going down to the Pacific coast will be considered. These contacts then went on as far as Central America.

The time frame considered is from the earliest times and up to the Late Classical Period (600–900 CE).

== Regional communication ==
Early Mesoamerican Ballgame sites

Scholars have long identified a number of similarities between the ancient Guatemalan and Mexican art styles and cultures. These similarities start as far north as the Mexico Central Plateau and continue to the Pacific coast and as far as Central America. There are many common elements in iconography, stone sculptures and artefacts. All this led to the investigation of possible trade patterns and communication networks.

Based on archaeological and ethno historical study in eastern Guerrero since 1998, an important network of roads through the Sierra Madres of Guerrero has been identified. These roads connected the settlements in Morelos and Puebla to the longer Pacific Coast communication and trade route.

It is certain this route played a critical role in the political and economic development of southern Mesoamerica, although its importance varied over time.

There was material and information trade between the Mexico Central Plateau, the Gulf of Mexico and the Pacific Ocean, it is not certain whether it was made through direct contact (15 day or more trips and 15 days to return) or by indirect means (trading goods from community to community, without the high land people ever seeing coastal people).

=== Roads ===
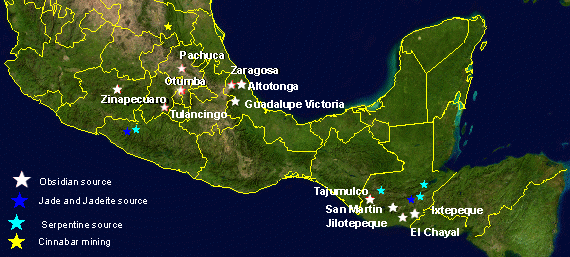
Map showing Mesoamerican obsidian sources, as well as the sources of other important semi-precious minerals. Obsidian use in Mesoamerica goes back to the earliest times, and there were extensive trade routes

Routes from the Gulf of Mexico Mountains and the center of Oaxaca seem to have been constantly open to circulation, since at least the early preclassical period; the Pacific route was apparently blocked at different points, between Chiapas and Oaxaca, for example, during the postclassical period by the Mixtec kingdom of Tututepec on the eve of the Spanish Conquest. One group of epiclassical sculptures indicates iconographic relationships between Morelos and Guerrero, with examples also found in Pacific Coastal Chiapas and Guatemala.

According to Fray Bernardino de Sahagún (1989:267) Mesoamerica prehispanic roads were simple compacted dirt paths, full of stone and limited by surrounding vegetation. Today these roads have disappeared, whether by railway or asphalt roads and freeways or by abandonment at prehispanic times, in addition to normal erosion deterioration, sedimentation and invasion of adjacent vegetation.

Systematic archaeological and ethnic-historical studies in eastern Guerrero from 1998, have demonstrated the existence of an important road network through the mountain ranges of Guerrero, that connected archaeological sites of Morelos and the south of Puebla with a communication and commerce trade route throughout the Pacific Ocean coast.

=== Historical Routes ===
Without taking into consideration branches and secondary deviations, there are several routes identified, that connected the center of Mexico with the Guatemala Pacific Coast, one through Puebla and the sierra, and the other through Guerrero and the Pacific Ocean coast. Both joined at Juchitán. From Juchitán, again, there were two routes to Guatemala, one on the north that lead to MIxco-Kaminaljuyu and the other on the south that lead to Escuintla.

=== North Route Tenochtitlan – Juchitán ===
This route left Tenochtitlan to Puebla, Cholula (Tlaxcala Plateau), Orizaba and down to the "Eastern Sierra Madre" range to Tuxtepec, Matias Romero and from there, towards the Isthmus.

An alternate route from Cholula went southwards, towards Tehuacán, Oaxaca, Monte Albán and down to Juchitán.

=== Middle Route Tenochtitlan – Juchitán ===
This route crosses through Oaxaca had two alternatives:

- Via de Tehuacán Valley, through the Cuicatlán and Teotitlán Ravine
- Through the Morelos Valley and then through the Lower Mixteca, Huajuapan de León; as well as Mixteca Alta, Yanhuitlán and Nochistlán.

From the Oaxaca central valleys the route went towards Nejapa, Tequisistlán, and arrived at Tehuantepec, then Juchitán. and.

=== South Route Tenochtitlan – Juchitán ===
This route started at Tenochtitlan, south to Morelos, Chalcatzingo and headed east towards the state of Guerrero, passing through Chiautla, Huamuxtitlán, Tlapa and Ometepec, from there headed towards the "Sierra Madre del Sur" and the coast, via Tututepec and Huatulco all the way up to Tehuantepec.

=== Route Juchitán to Guatemala ===
From Juchitán to Guatemala there were two routes, north and south.

- The northern route, went from Juchitán to Tapanatepec and then towards "Chiapa de los Indios" (Chiapa de Corzo) and headed towards Comitán and then, in Guatemalan territory, onto Huehuetenango, Quetzaltenango, Chimaltenango and Mixco Viejo.
- The southern Isthmus or Soconusco route continued from Tapanatepec to Tonalá, Pijijiapan, Tuxtla Chico, and then in Guatemalan territory, onto Retalhuleu and down to Santa Lucía Cotzumalguapa, Escuintla.

In spite of the importance of these routes, passage through these routes was blocked by the Mixtec Kingdom of Tututepec, that monopolized it for their own benefit and caused tensions with the political groups of the Mexican Plateau, especially with the Triple Alliance.

== Regional relations and commerce ==
Formative Period in southern Mesoamerica

There are numerous evidences of regional trade from northwestern mesoamerican civilizations, the Mexican highlands and Centro America with southern lands as far down as Peru and Colombia, some of which are suspected but remain a strong possibility, based on evidences. Certainly, it is elemental understanding how people traveled and traded.

As early as 1881, Carl Bovallius Swedish archaeologist and investigator exploring Central America (Ometepe and Zapatera), noted: "Los Orotinas far separated from their relations, inhabiting the peninsula of Nicoya and the territory of Guanacaste, which comprises the north-western part of the republic of Costa Rica. Opinions vary, however, with regard to these groups, several authors being inclined to regard los Cholutecas as a detached branch of los Pipiles in El Salvador; they would then be of Toltecan origin. Certainly there are a number of local names within their district which seem to corroborate this opinion."

According to Bovallius, other writers are disposed to ascribe a Mexican origin to the Orotiñas and lastly Dr. Berendt suggests that the whole Chorotegan stock may be considered as a Toltecan offspring, the name Choroteganos being only a corruption of Cholutecas. According to the concurrent testimonies of the old chroniclers the Niquirans were a Mexican people settled in the country at a comparatively late period. It is not clear whether they were Toltecs or Aztecs, and this question cannot probably be decided until the ancient remains, surely very numerous, that they have left behind them, shall have been accurately studied and compared with the better known Mexican antiquities. The intelligent and well-built Indians on the island of Ometepec are doubtless the descendants of the Niquirans; this is corroborated by their language, which the successful investigations of SQUIER have shown to be of Mexican origin and presenting a very close similarity to the pure Aztec tongue. (Written in 1886)

An elemental piece of this discussion was provided by Bernal Diaz del Castillo, who mentioned that once they took over Tenochtitlan (1521 CE), lords from Tehuantepec came before Hernán Cortés to ask for help in fighting one of their neighbors, Tututepec, whom were battling them constantly. Cortes sent Pedro de Alvarado who in time conquered Tututepec. It is interesting understanding the Tututepec political expansion and their western wars against the Mexicas, near Ometepec, Guerrero and to the east with Tehuantepec, they had blocked that route during the Mesoamerican postclassical period.

There are many debates related to the definition of specific sculptures styles, in general terms the Parsons proposal is accepted, in the sense that there is a mesoamerican sculpture tradition from the preclassical to the postclassical periods, with divergent lines, some of which disappear and others with evolving styles from regional development, and that at the same time, with cross information from a region to another, that there are spectacular fashion styles that may vanish at a point in time, only to return adapted to new conditions.

This process has an effect in the chronology, makes an exact dating of pieces troublesome, the problem is compounded because the majority of the pieces lost their original context, some from prehispanic times.

=== Early Preclassical Period (1200–900 BCE) ===
Based on the presence of a ceramic style pottery shaped as pots (Tecomates), found in the Tlapa and Huamuxtitlán, it is known that the region had an early cultural development predating the Olmecs.

A female ceramic figurine from the Huamuxtitlán valley indicates an archaeological occupation of eastern Guerrero, contemporary to the Chiapas Ocós Phase (1500–1350 BCE); while the appearance of Olmec type figures in Marquelia at the Costa Chica, could prove an Olmec transition process, as proposed for Mazatán, Chiapas during the Cherla and Cuadros Phases (1350–1150 BCE). See Figure 4 of Huamuxtitlán and Figure 5 Marquelia Page 927

=== Mid-Preclassical Period (900-500 BCE) ===
Stratigraphic wells and radiocarbon dating at the Contlalco and Cerro Quemado-La Coquera sites in the Tlapa Valley, Guerrero, confirm massive platforms construction between 740 and 500 BCE.

Olmec-style murals in the Oxotitlán, Juxtlahuaca and Cauadzidziqui caves and sculpture from the Teopantecuanitlan site, confirm a strong connection with Chalcatzingo in the Valley of Morelos. Iconographic representations similarities of these sites with the Pacific coast of Chiapas and Guatemala, depict closer relations than those suggested by the argument that they simply share a pan-mesoamerican tradition.

Thus, the style resemblance between Tak´alik Ab´aj, Guatemala monument 1 and individuals depicted on Chalcatzingo relief 1-B-2 have been repeatedly established.

Should also note the similarity between the relief of Chalchuapa (El Salvador) with the main character of Cauadzidziqui, Guerrero. Other cases involving close similarities are noted in Xoc, Chiapas, and the San Miguel Amuco, Guerrero relief.

=== Late Preclassical Period (500 BCE – 200 CE) ===
According to Parsons, during this time an iconographical transition between the Olmec and Izapa communication codes takes place, as would be the cases of Monument 55 of Takalik Abaj, Guatemala, and Monument 1 of Huamelulpan, Oaxaca.

However, for the case of Guerrero and Morelos this phase lends itself to controversy, since chronologically speaking the mixture of time periods of Olmec symbols in sculptures and reliefs is not understood, as reported by the main archeological sites of the region. The symbols permanence from one period to another is the main factor that makes the task difficult of understanding the styles evolution and the connections between diverse regions. See Takalik Abaj, Guatemala, Monument 55 and the Huamelulpan, Oaxaca Monument

The S-inverted glyph complex would be represented by Chalcatzingo petroglyph 1-A- : a seated individual inside a cavity, accompanied by two glyphs precisely resembling a horizontal letter S.

Parsons noticed that this S-inverted glyph appears also at the chest of the post-Olmec sculpture of Palo Gordo, Suchitepéquez, known as the "Piedra Santa" (holy stone) sculpture. This same glyph is repeated in Chalcatzingo's monument 31 where the S-inverted is depicted in a scene in which a bird beaked jaguar attacks a human.

Another identifiable figure is the bird-man, characterized by men dressed as birds. This figure can be identified at the mid-preclassical Oxotitlan cave, as well as Estela 4 and altar 3 at Izapa, during the late preclassical and continues to be used during the epiclassical sculpture at Villa Rotaria, in the Guerrero Costa Grande.

The use of the Pacific Ocean communication route during the late preclassical, is also inferred from the Izapa estela-smooth altar and its similarity to the steles and smooth altars found at the sites of the Pelillo and Metates sites of the Costa Chica, Guerrero; as with the "barrigones" of Monte Alto, Guatemala and the full-bodied "barrigon" from Cola Palma, Pinotepa Nacional in the boundaries between Oaxaca and Guerrero.

=== Late Classical Period (600–900 CE) ===
During the early classical and even up to 600 CE, the iconographic codes seem to be silenced. The Petén and Usumacinta Mayan style dominate in the Chiapas and Guatemala highlands. On the Oaxaca coast the codes become Zapote and Ñuiñe, while in Guerrero and the Guatemala Costa Teotihuacan predominates. Decomposition of the Teotihuacano political system started by the 650 CE, coincides with a revival of iconographic codes of the Pacific coast. The Cotzumalguapa style flourishes in the Guatemala coast, while Guerrero registers the same code shared is sites like Xochicalco, Teotenango and Cacaxtla. Reminiscent of the late preclassical, the scenes can be quite elaborate and are accompanied by multiple glyphs and numerals which are used to represent calendar dates or names of the characters.

Again there are coincidences style and themes throughout the coast of the Pacific, there is a clear example in crossed arms sculptures, apparently representations of ancestors. The complex of men jaguar, present since the Tuxtla Chico mid-preclassical sculpture and observable even today with guerrerenses peoples fertility dances, reached a great splendor in the case of El Baúl, Stela 27 and Piedra Labrada, monument 3. Jaguars of these two sites, El Baúl and Piedra Labrada, exhibit also aesthetic similarities as noticed in the 1960s by Miles. Sometimes, as in Xochicalco stele 3; Horcones stele 4 (Chiapas), and a ceramic figurine from Azoyú, Guerrero, Jaguars have bifid tongues, as if recalling a "heart devouring" ancient deity, depicted in the Teotihuacan murals of Atetelco.

In 1986, when Carlos Navarrete registered the sculptural body of Cerro Bernal, was the first to propose the iconographic relationship between central Mexico and the Pacific coast, by associating the body glyph and iconography of the Horcones stele 3 with Xochicalco Stela 2. It is now known that this association followed the Guerrero and Costa Chica route, thanks to the two Tlaloc representations located in Chilpancingo. One of the Tlaloc figures has the "cuatro movimiento" (four movement) glyph in the chest, in the same style used in Xochicalco. Characters with goggles, possibly rain deities are present along the coast, as in the case of the so-called "Dios Cangrejo" (God Crab) from Bilbao" and Monument 12 at Piedra Labrada.

Another example present in both regions is the death deities that "crumble" hearts with skeletal hands, as the case of El Baúl, monument 4 and Terreno de Coimbra monument 1, near Marquelia, on the Guerrero Costa Chica. The Coimbra death deity is probably associated with the complex of death gods, such as those of Palo Gordo, but finding more samples in eastern Guerrero, are required to confirm this relationship.

Just like during the early classical, is during the postclassical period when the iconographic connection is lost again, detected between the Valley of Morelos and Guerrero, and Guerrero eastern coast of Chiapas with Guatemala, is lost. But unlike the early classical, it is known that during the postclassical period, the Tututepec political expansion is responsible for having blocked the Pacific route and the route never again had important traffic. Ironically it is today, with migrants and narcotics trafficking, when the Pacific route, land and maritime, has strongly resurfaced reviving routes lost a thousand years ago.

== See also ==
- Metallurgy in pre-Columbian Mesoamerica

== Bibliography ==
- Chinchilla Mazariegos, Oswaldo. 2002. Palo Gordo, Guatemala, y el estilo artístico Cotzumalguapa. En Incidents of Archaeology in Central America and Yucatán: Essays in Honor of Edwin M. Shook (editado por M. Love, M. Hatch y H. Escobedo), pp. 147–178. University Press, Lanham, Maryland.
- De la Fuente, Beatriz 1995. Tetitla. En La pintura mural prehispánica en México, Teotihuacan (editado por B. De la Fuente), Vol.1, No.1, pp. 258–311. Universidad Nacional Autónoma de México, México.
- Díaz del Castillo, Bernal 1976. Historia de la conquista de Nueva España, undécima edición. Editorial Porrúa, México.
- Graham, John A. 1981. Abaj Takalik: The Olmec Style and its Antecedents in Pacific Guatemala. En Ancient Mesoamerica: Selected Readings (editado por J. Graham), pp. 163–176. Peek Publications, Palo Alto, California.
- Grove, David C. 1996. Archaeological Contexts of Olmec Art Outside of the Gulf Coast. En Olmec Art of Ancient Mexico (editado por E. Benson y B. de la Fuente), pp. 105–117. National Gallery of Art, Washington, D.C..
- Gutiérrez, Gerardo, Viola Köenig, and Baltazar Brito 2009. Codex Humboldt Fragment 1 (Ms. Amer. 2) and Codex Azoyú 2 Reverse: The Tribute Record of Tlapa to the Aztec Empire/Códice Humboldt Fragmento 1 (Ms.amer.2) y Códice Azoyú 2 Reverso: Nómina de tributos de Tlapa y su provincial al Imperio Mexicano. Bilingual (Spanish-English) edition. Mexico: CIESAS and Stiftung Preußischer Kulturbesitz (Berlin).
- Gutiérrez, Gerardo, and Constantino Medina 2008. Toponimia nahuatl en los codices Azoyú 1 y 2: Un estudio crítico de los nombres de lugar de los antiguos señoríos del oriente de Guerrero. [Nahuatl Toponymy in the Azoyú Codices 1 and 2: A Critical Study of the Placenames of the Ancient Lords of Eastern Guerrero]. Mexico: CIESAS.
- Gutiérrez, Gerardo 2003. Territorial Structure and Urbanism in Mesoamerica: The Huaxtec and Mixtec-Tlapanec-Nahua Cases. In Urbanism in Mesoamerica, W. Sanders, G. Mastache and R. Cobean, (eds.), pp. 85–118. University Park: The Pennsylvania State University and INAH.
- Gutiérrez, Gerardo, Alfredo Vera, Mary E. Pye, and Juan Mitzi Serrano 2011. Contlalco y La Coquera: Arqueología de dos sitios tempranos del Municipio de Tlapa, Guerrero. Mexico: Municipio de Tlapa de Comonfort, Letra Antigua.
- Miles, Susana W. 1965. Summary of Preconquest Ethnology of the Guatemala-Chiapas Highlands and Pacific Slopes. En Handbook of Middle American Indians, Vol.2 (editado por G. Willey), pp. 276–287. University of Texas Press, Austin.
- Navarrete, Carlos 1978. The Prehispanic System of Communications Between Chiapas and Tabasco. En Mesoamerican Communication Routes and Cultural Contacts (editado por T. A. Lee Jr. y C. Navarrete), pp. 75–106. Papers of the New World Archaeological Foundation, No. 40. Brigham Young University, Provo.
- Stephen A. Kowalewski y Andrew K. Balkansky, 1999. Estudio Regional en la Mixteca Alta Central, Oaxaca, México
- Balkansky, Andrew K. 1998. Urbanism and Early State Formation in the Huamelulpan Valley of Southern Mexico. Latin American Antiquity. Vol 9 No. 1, pp. 37–67 Dec 2007
- Christensen, Alexander F. 1998. Colonization and Microevolution in Formative Oaxaca, Mexico, World Archaeology, Vol 30, 2 pp. 262–285 Dec 2007
- Coll Hurtado, Atlántida 1998. Oaxaca: geografía histórica de la grana cochinilla, Boletín de Investigaciones Geográficas. Vol. 38 pp. 71–81 March 2007
- Dalghren de Jordán, Barbro (1966): La Mixteca, su cultura e historia prehispánicas, Universidad Nacional Autónoma de México, México.
- Flannery Kent V. y Joyce Marcus (2007): "Las sociedades jerárquicas oaxaqueñas y el intercambio con los olmecas", en Arqueología Mexicana, (87): 71–76, Editorial Raíces, México.
- Gaxiola González, Margarita (2007), "Huamelulpan, Oaxaca", en Arqueología Mexicana, (90): 34–35, Editorial Raíces, México.
- Michel Graulich (2003), "El sacrificio humano en Mesoamérica", en Arqueología Mexicana, (63): 16-21.
- Hosler, Dorothy (1997), "Los orígenes andinos de la metalurgia del occidente de México", en el sitio en internet de la Biblioteca Luis Ángel Arango del Banco de la República de Colombia, consultado el 31 de enero de 2010.
- Jansen, Maarten (1992), "Mixtec Pictography: Contents and Conventions", en Reifler Bricker, Victoria (ed.): Epigraphy. Supplement to the Handbook of Middle-American Indians, University of Texas Press, 20–33, Austin.
- Jansen, Maarten y Gabina Aurora Pérez Jiménez (2002), "Amanecer en Ñuu Dzavui", en Arqueología mexicana, (56): 42–47, Editorial Raíces, México.
- Josserand, J. Kathryn; Maarten Jansen y Ángeles Romero (1984), "Mixtec dialectology: inferences from Linguistics and Ethnohistory", en J. K. Josserand, Marcus C. Winter y Nicholas A. Hopkins (eds.), Essays in Otomanguean Culture and History, Vanderbilt University Publications in Anthropology, 119–230, Nashville.
- Joyce, Arthur A. y Marc N. Levine (2007)", Tututepec (Yuca Dzaa). Un imperio del Posclásico en la Mixteca de la Costa", en Arqueología Mexicana, (90): 44–47, Editorial Raíces, México.
- Joyce, Arthur A. y Marcus Winter (1996), "Ideology, Power, and Urban Society in Pre-Hispanic Oaxaca", en Current Anthropology, 37(1, feb. 1996): 33–47, The University of Chicago Press, Chicago.
- Justeson, John S. 1986. The Origin of Writing Systems: Preclassic Mesoamerica, World Archaeology. Vol. 17 nos. 3. pp. 437–458 Dec. 2007
- Lind, Michael (2008), "Arqueología de la Mixteca", en Desacatos, (27): 13–32.
- Maldonado, Blanca E. (2005): "Metalurgia tarasca del cobre en el sitio de Itziparátzico, Michoacán, México", en el sitio en internet de FAMSI, consultado el 31 de enero de 2010.
- Marcus, Joyce (2001): "Breaking the glass ceiling: the strategies of royal women in ancient states", en Cecelia F. Klein (ed.), Gender in Pre-Hispanic America, Dumbarton Oaks Research Library and Collection.
- Oudijk, Michel R. (2007), "Mixtecos y zapotecos en la época prehispánica", en Arqueología Mexicana, (90): 58–62, Editorial Raíces, México.
- Paddock, John (1990): "Concepción de la idea Ñuiñe", en Oaxaqueños de antes, Oaxaca Antiguo A.C. y Casa de la Cultura Oaxaqueña, Oaxaca de Juárez.
- Rivera Guzmán, Ángel Iván (1998): "La iconografía del poder en los grabados del Cerro de La Caja, Mixteca Baja de Oaxaca", en Barba de Piña Chan, Beatriz (ed.), Iconografía mexicana, Plaza y Valdés-INAH, México.
- Rossell, Cecilia y María de los Ángeles Ojeda Díaz (2003), Mujeres y sus diosas en los códices preshispánicos de Oaxaca, CIESAS-Miguel Ángel Porrúa, México.
- Villela Flores, Samuel (2006), "Los estudios etnológicos en Guerrero", en Diario de Campo, (38, agosto 2006): 29–44, Instituto Nacional de Antropología e Historia, México.
- Spores, Ronald (1967), The Mixtec Kings and Their People, University of Oklahoma Press, Norman.
- ------- (2007), "La Mixteca y los mixtecos. 3000 años de adaptación cultural", en Arqueología Mexicana, (90): 28–33, Editorial Raíces, México.
- Terraciano, Kevin (2001), The Mixtecs of colonial Oaxaca: Nudzahui history, sixteenth through eighteenth centuries, Stanford University Press, Stanford.
