= Huamelulpan (archaeological site) =

Archaeological site in Oaxaca, Mexico

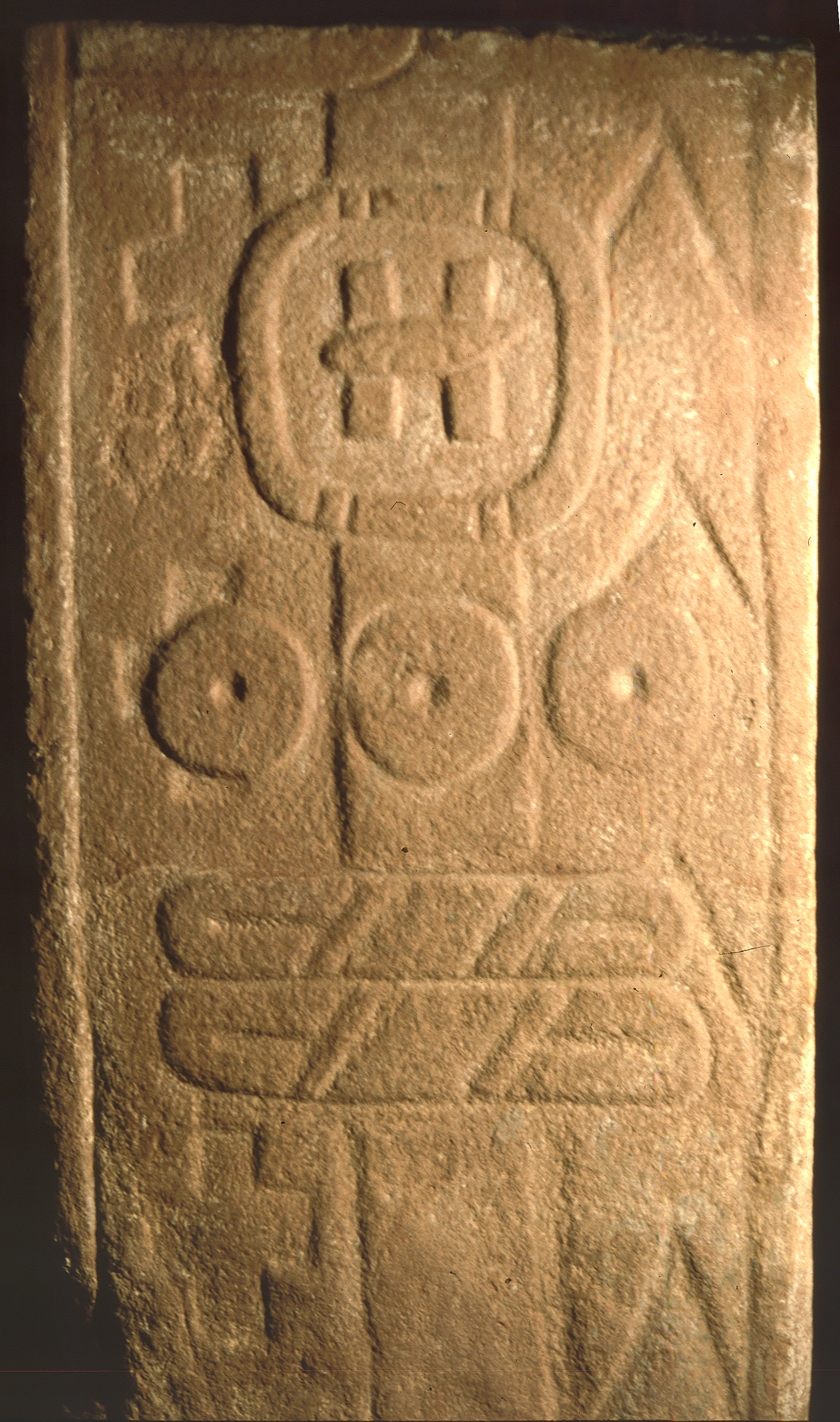
- Stela at Huamelulpa
- Interactive map of Huamelulpan
- 17°33′02″N 97°24′58″W
- Type: Mesoamerican archaeology
- Periods: Mesoamerican Preclassical, Classical and Postclassical (Ramos Phase)
- Cultures: Mixtec (Lower)
- Location: San Martín Huamelulpan, Oaxaca, Mexico
- Region: Mesoamerica

History
- Built: 400 BCE to 800 CE

Site notes
- Website: Huamelulpan Archaeological Site

Huamelulpan is an archaeological site of the Mixtec culture, located in the town of San Martín Huamelulpan at an elevation of 2,218 metres (7,277 ft), about 96 kilometres (60 mi) north-west of the city of Oaxaca, the capital of Oaxaca state.

Because of its dimensions it must have been one of the largest Mesoamerican cities of its time, and also one with the longest occupation, from the Preclassic to the Postclassic Periods. The apogee of the settlement is estimated at the Ramos Phase (300 BCE – 200 CE), the period of Mesoamerican urban society's development.

The site was part of other early settlements in the region, such as Cerro de las Minas, Yucuita, Diquiyú and Monte Negro. Their apogee is characterized by monumental architecture and sculptures, there is also evidence of clear social stratification within their residential zones.

During site investigations many high quality urns were found here, similar Zapotec samples were found in the central valleys. Carved monoliths were found at the site, these are considered to be unique since none have been found at other Mixtec urban centers that have such similarity to the Zapotec writing of Monte Albán.

== History ==
The foundation of this ancient prehispanic city goes back to 400 BCE, it was an important urban center up to 800 CE; it is a good sample of the early Mixtec culture, called Ñuu Sa Na' or "Ancient People" (Ñuu Yata in the Mixteca Baja).

During their early urban stages, Huamelulpan and the main Mixtec centers maintained complex and variable relations with Monte Albán. Towards 200 CE, some Mixtec centers were partially or totally abandoned and between 400 and 800 CE, there was another urban center boom, when Huamelulpan and other sites lost their close relationships with Monte Albán and established new relations with Lower Mixtec centers linked with groups from Puebla and perhaps the Valley of Mexico. The Lower Mixtec (Ñuiñe) culture developed at this time. The city was abandoned by the Postclassic and it was only used for sumptuary burials.

According to archaeological history, the site was a very important Mixtec center, where tributes were received, to be traded with Puebla, Tehuacán and all of Oaxaca to the Pacific coast; from Tehuacán and Puebla traded fabrics and yarns, from the coast traded chilies, Jamaica, jicaras, dried fish, salt, sea shells used for necklaces, earrings, etc.

Ancient Huamelulpan had important weapon and fur workshops.

=== Discovery ===
The Huamelulpan archaeological site was discovered in 1933 by Alfonso Caso and many of the pieces found are in exhibition at the Town Community Museum.

=== Toponymy ===
The name Huamelulpan comes from the Nahuatl language, a language that was not spoken by the original inhabitants. Its Nahuatl name means "In the huautli mound", the Mixtec name is Yucunindaba, and it means "Hill that flew".

Jansen y Pérez Jimenez offer an alternative opinion, that the native name is Yucunundaua, which translates "Hill of the Wooden Columns".

According to the Mexico Municipalities Encyclopedia, the name Huamelulpam was developed from two huamil trees that grew together and formed a letter (h), the story goes that these trees lasted for centuries, and the town was called Huamelulpam.

=== Mixtec phases ===
The Alta-Mixteca region development has been segregated into various phases; Cruz, Ramos, Las Flores and Natividad, that covers the region development from about 1500 BCE to 1530 CE.

Cruz-Ramos transition. During the transition from the mid-formative period (Late Cruz) to the late- formative (Early Ramos) the number of sites decreased in the studied area.

It is considered a consequence of the development of early Mixtec urban centers – a process observed elsewhere in Oaxaca – the Central Valleys, the Huamelulpan Valley, and the Eastern Nochixtlán Valley. Two of the Early Ramos sites – Monte Negro and Cerro Jazmin – were already urban centers covering more than one km^{2}.

There is an apparent absence of settlements dating to the Late Ramos (200 B.C.-200 A.D.) in the major part of the area surveyed (only 15 sites, 170 ha comparing to 62 sites and 700 ha of Early Ramos). It is a striking fact because in Yucuita and Huamelulpan this period was a time of the major centralization and florescence of the regional states and general growth of the population. At the same time only two sites in the surveyed area had continuous occupation from Early Ramos to Early Flores while 20 had a gap between these phases.

Mixteca Alta Survey (Tlaxiaco, Teposcolula and Nochixtlán)
Phase	Chronnology	Tlaxiaco	Teposcolula	Nochixtlán	Total
Cruz	1500–300 BCE	47 Sites	40 Sites	29 Sites	116 Sites
Ramos	300 BCE – 200 CE	41 Sites	27 Sites	10 Sites	78 Sites
Las Flores	200–1000 CE	92 Sites	67 Sites	49 Sites	208 Sites
Natividad	1000–1530 CE	199 Sites	179 Sites	88 Sites	466 Sites
Regional survey in the Central Mixteca Alta, Oaxaca, México. Conducted between January 1 and June 15, 1999.

=== Mixtec culture ===
The Mixtec (or Mixteca) are indigenous Mesoamerican peoples inhabiting the Mexican states of Oaxaca, Guerrero and Puebla in a region known as La Mixteca. The Mixtecan languages form an important branch of the Otomanguean language family.

The name "Mixtec" is a Nahuatl exonym, from [miʃ] 'cloud' [teka] 'inhabitant of place of'. Speakers of Mixtec use an expression (which varies by dialect) to refer to their own language, and generally this expression means "word of the rain": Tu'un Sávi [tũˀũ saβi] in one variety, for example, and Dà'àn Dávi [ðãˀã ðaβi] in another.

=== Mixtec language ===
The Mixtecan languages constitute a branch of the Otomanguean language family of Mexico. The Mixtecan branch includes the Trique (or Triqui) languages, spoken by about 24,500 people; Cuicatec, spoken by about 15,000 people; and the large group of Mixtec languages proper, spoken by about 511,000 people. Again, the Mixtec languages proper are a grouping within the Mixtecan branch of the Otomanguean family. Virtually all of the remainder of this article is about Mixtec proper; for Cuicatec and Trique, see the separate articles. The internal classification of the Mixtecan branch, i.e., the subgrouping between Trique, Cuicatec, and Mixtec proper, is an open question. As to the Mixtec languages proper, identifying how many there are poses challenges at the level of linguistic theory. Depending on the criteria for distinguishing between a difference of dialects and a difference of languages, there may be as many as 50 different Mixtec languages

=== Language, codices, and artwork ===
The Mixtecan languages (in their many variants) were estimated to be spoken by about 300,000 people at the end of the 20th century, although the majority of Mixtec speakers also had at least a working knowledge of the Spanish language. Some Mixtecan languages are called by names other than Mixtec, particularly Cuicatec (Cuicateco), and Triqui (or Trique).

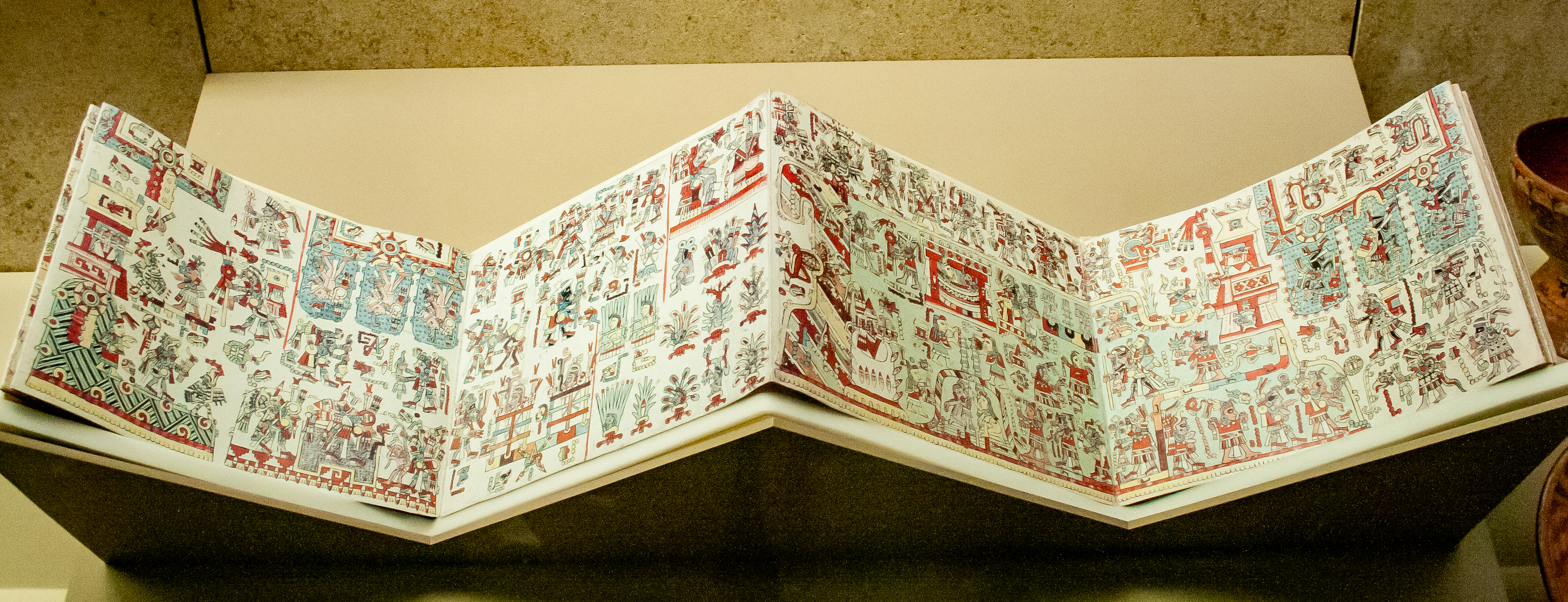
Codex Zouche-Nuttall, a prehispanic piece of Mixtec writing, now in the British Museum

The Mixtec are well known in the anthropological world for their Codices, or phonetic pictures in which they wrote their history and genealogies in deerskin in the "fold-book" form. The best known story of the Mixtec Codices is that of Lord Eight Deer, named after the day in which he was born, whose personal name is Jaguar Claw, and whose epic history is related in several codices, including the Codex Bodley and Codex Zouche-Nuttall. He successfully conquered and united most of the Mixteca region.

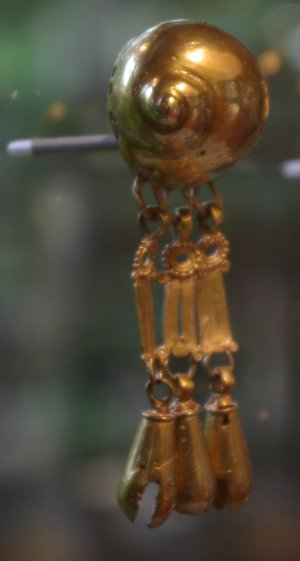
Snail shell pendant, 900-1520 CE, gold, Dumbarton Oaks Museum, Washington, D.C.

They were also known for their exceptional mastery of jewelry, in which gold and turquoise figure prominently. The production of Mixtec goldsmiths formed an important part of the tribute the Mixtecs had to pay to the Aztecs during parts of their history.

=== Mixtec writing ===
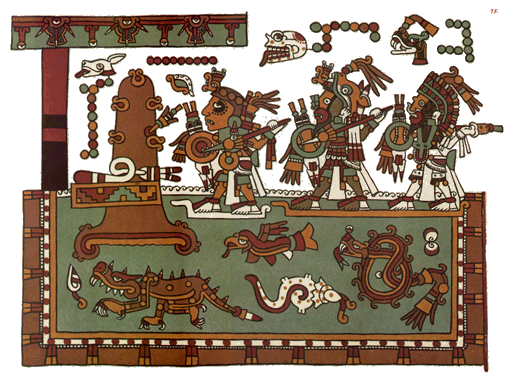
An example of the pictorial representations the Mixtecs used for non-verbal communication through writing. Here, in this picture, which is a reproduction of a work from the Codex Zouche-Nuttall, a village is being sacked by some warriors.

Mixtec writing originated as a pictographic system during the Post-Classic period in Mesoamerican history. Records of genealogy, historic events, and myths are found in the pre-Columbian Mixtec codices. The arrival of Europeans in 1520 CE caused changes in form, style, and the function of the Mixtec writings. Today these codices and other Mixtec writings are used as a source of ethnographic, linguistic, and historical information for scholars, and help to preserve the identity of the Mixtec people as migration and globalization introduce new cultural influences.

== The site ==
The archaeological site includes two sets of terraces, arranged in the slope of a hill. The first set has platforms with slopped walls, stairway, hydraulic system and stands with carved numerals. The second group is integrated by two platforms, formed by rectangular structures with slopped walls and stucco remains. In addition to these groups, there are several tombs and mounds not yet explored.

=== Structures ===
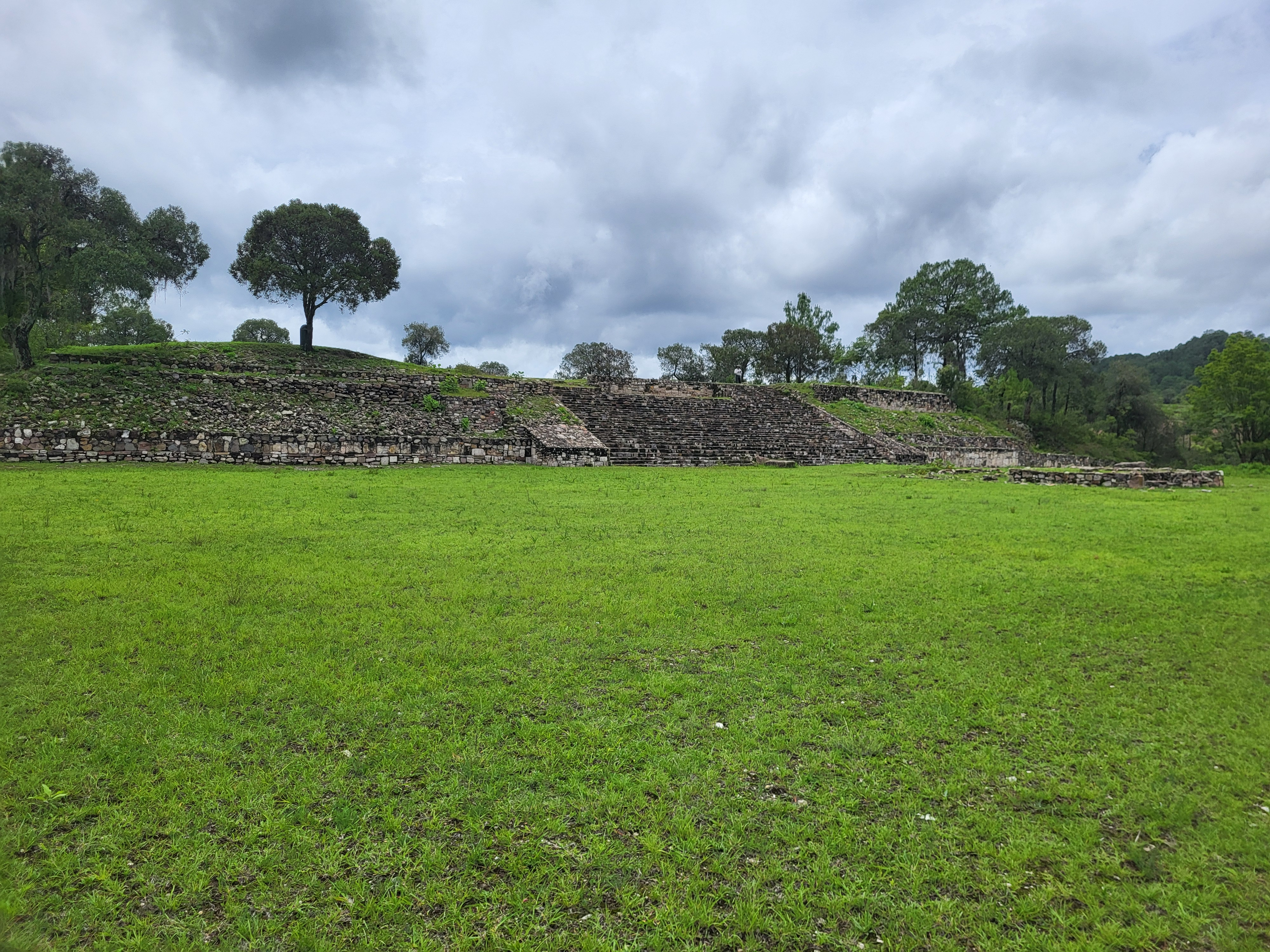
Lower platform of the Cerro Volado group

The main structures of this group are oriented to the west and include: a large square platform, with a central plaza and knolls in three sides; a large terrace or Plaza 2 with an altar; and a ballgame court I shaped, 70 meters long. The explorations in the residential zones produced findings of tombs and burials with ceramics and other offerings.

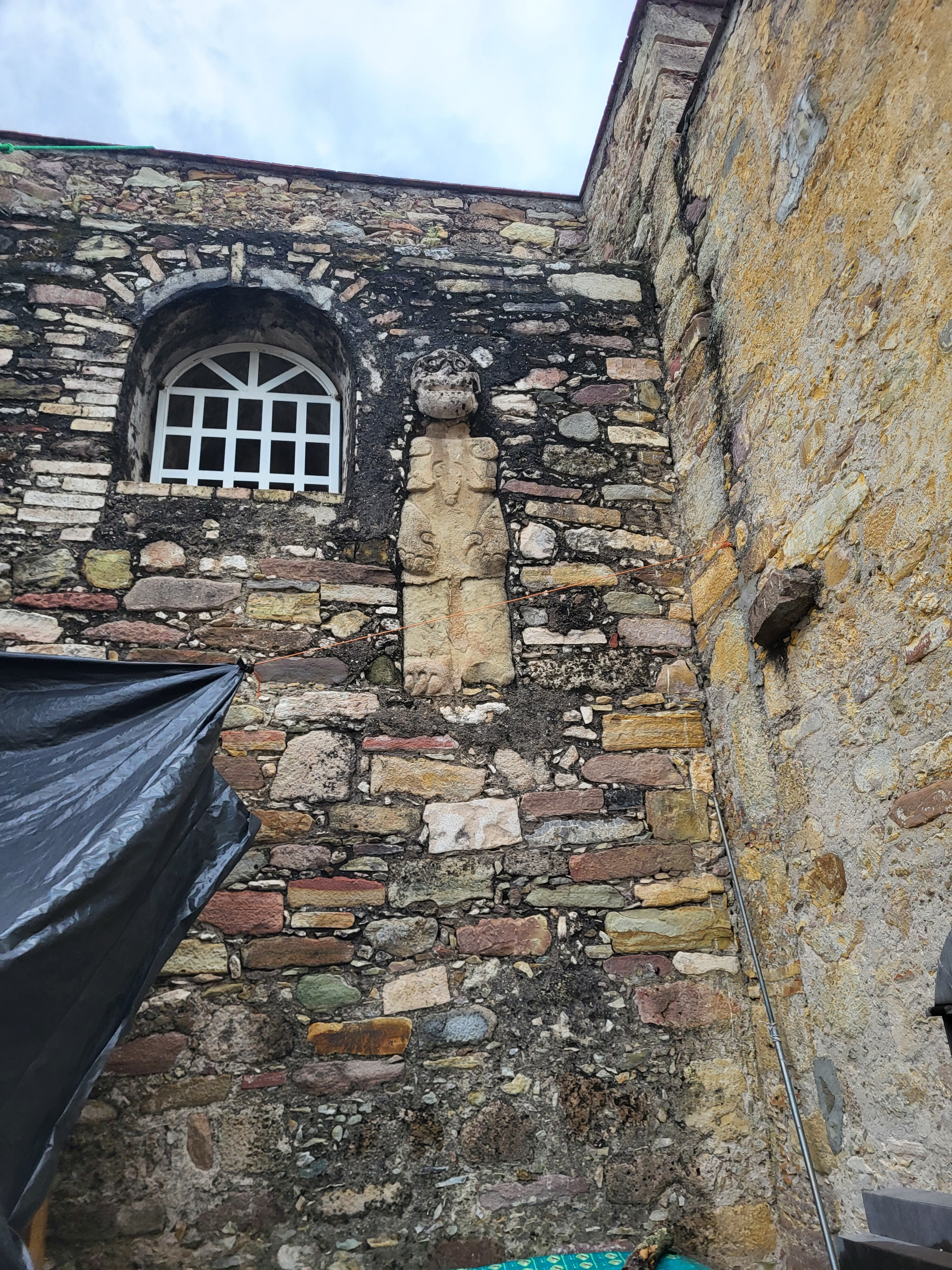
Effigy of Mictlantecuhtli that was incorporated into the courtyard wall of the Old Church

There are five main sets at the site, each with several structures.

==== Cerro Volado ====
This group is formed by two large plazas with a mound in the center; others of smaller size are dispersed in the plazas.

==== Pantheon Group ====
The group is located to the foot of the "Cerro Volado" and has four low platforms around a patio.

==== Old Church ====
The group is made up by two badly damaged platforms, with a housing area located between this group and the Pantheon.

The Church Group is the largest; it is a hill terrace east of the center of the municipality, with old constructions in its slopes and on which a modern-day church was built with stones removed from the ancient constructions, these can be seen embedded in its walls with visible carved characters.

==== Western Group ====
The group west of the Church has several platforms constructed at different levels.

== Regional communication ==
Regional communications in ancient Mesoamerica are believed to have been extensive. There were various trade routes attested since prehistoric times.

Scholars have long identified a number of similarities between the ancient Guatemalan and Mexican art styles and cultures. These similarities start as far north as the Mexico Central Plateau and continue to the Pacific coast and as far as Central America. There are many common elements in iconography, stone sculptures and artefacts. All this led to the investigation of possible trade patterns and communication networks.

It is certain this route played a critical role in the political and economic development of southern Mesoamerica, although its importance varied over time. There was material and information trade between the Mexico Central Plateau, the Gulf of Mexico and the Pacific Ocean.

== See also ==
- Mixtec Culture
- Yucuita
- San José Mogote
- Cerro de las Minas
- Izapa
- Guerrero
- Oaxaca
- Chiapas
- Chalcatzingo
- Oxtotitlán
- Juxtlahuaca
- Teopantecuanitlan
- Costa Chica
- Mazatán, Chiapas
- Comitán
- Chiapa de Corzo
- Tapanatepec
- Tonalá
- Pijijiapan
- Chiautla
- Huamuxtitlán
- Tlapa
- Ometepec

In Guatemala:

- Tak´alik Ab´aj,
- Bilbao
- Huehuetenango
- Quetzaltenango
- Chimaltenango
- Mixco Viejo
- Retalhuleu
- Santa Lucía Cotzumalguapa
- Escuintla

In El Salvador:

- Chalchuapa
- El Salvador

In Nicaragua:

- Ometepe
- Zapatera
