= Mixtec writing =

Logographic writing system

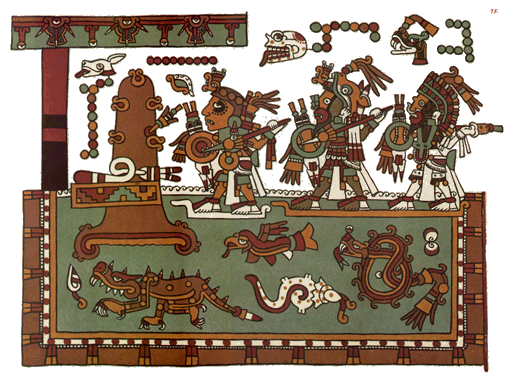
An example of the pictorial representations the Mixtecs used for non-verbal communication through writing. Here, in this picture, which is a reproduction of a work from the Codex Zouche-Nuttall, a village is being sacked by some warriors.

Mixtec writing originated as a logographic writing system during the Post-Classic period in Mesoamerican history. Records of genealogy, historic events, and cultural narratives are found in the pre-Columbian Mixtec codices. The arrival of Europeans in 1520 AD caused changes in form, style, and the function of the Mixtec writings. Today these codices and other Mixtec writings are used as a source of ethnographic, linguistic, and historical information for scholars, and help to preserve the identity of the Mixtec people as migration and globalization introduce new cultural influences.

== Mixtec history ==
The Mixtec are an indigenous people of Mesoamerica, located in the western region of the modern Mexican states of Oaxaca, eastern part of Guerrero, and southern part of Puebla. The history of the Mixtec people can be traced back to the Formative period, and continues through the Classic and Post-Classic periods to the arrival of Europeans in 1520 AD. Today the region is still populated by the Mixtec and Mixtecan speakers. During the 2500 years before the arrival of Europeans, the Mixtec developed complex social and economic traditions, effectively exploited their diverse environment, created a method of writing, and maintained their autonomy from other civilizations, such as the Aztecs.

The Mixtec language is part of the Otomanguean family of languages, a family found in Mesoamerican that includes Zapotec, another indigenous language found in Oaxaca. Mixtec speakers arrived in Oaxaca, notably the Alta region, during the early Formative period, 1500-750 BCE. Agriculture formed the base for Mixtec civilization and agricultural villages have been dated to 1350 BCE. Today Mixtec speakers are still found in Oaxaca and the neighboring regions of Puebla and Guerrero, though migration is spreading Mixtec speakers across Mexico and through the United States.

The early Classic period, 200 BCE – 300 CE, found the Mixtec civilization becoming more complex, with the adoption of a hierarchical settlement system. Artifacts and architecture display function and status differences reflecting this system of hierarchy. Urban centers were developed, the first of these being the core settlement of Yucuita. Yucuita was the largest and most complex of the early Classic urban centers, and existed for 500 years. It has been believed to be the possible capital of the Mixtec states during this period. The late Classic period was a continuation of the success and developments experienced during the early Classic period.

The Post-Classic period dates from 1000 CE and ends with the arrival of Europeans in 1519. During this period the region was populated with tiny kingdoms, called señorios and cacicazgos, which were centered on prior urban centers. At this time the Mixtec experienced their greatest population, though there was a decline in monumental urban projects; areas and structures were being maintained and reused, while new ceremonial centers and projects were less numerous and less impressive. Despite this, the Mixtec were a source of influence for Mesoamerica during this period. The archaeological record has produced evidence of neighboring regions influencing Mixtec art and culture in the periods prior, while during the Post-Classic the role was reversed, with Mixtec influences permeating the region and the neighboring cultures. This sharing of culture is also found in the writing systems of pre-Columbian Mesoamerica, as phonetic elements and symbols operated across cultures.

The arrival of the Spanish in Oaxaca in 1520 AD began the Colonial period. The Mixtec gave only minor resistance. The encomienda system was established in the region between 1525 and 1530 AD, and missionaries began their efforts to convert the Mixtec in 1538 AD. The arrival of the Spanish influence brought changes to the Mixtec culture, as is seen in the following example of the Mixtec writing system.

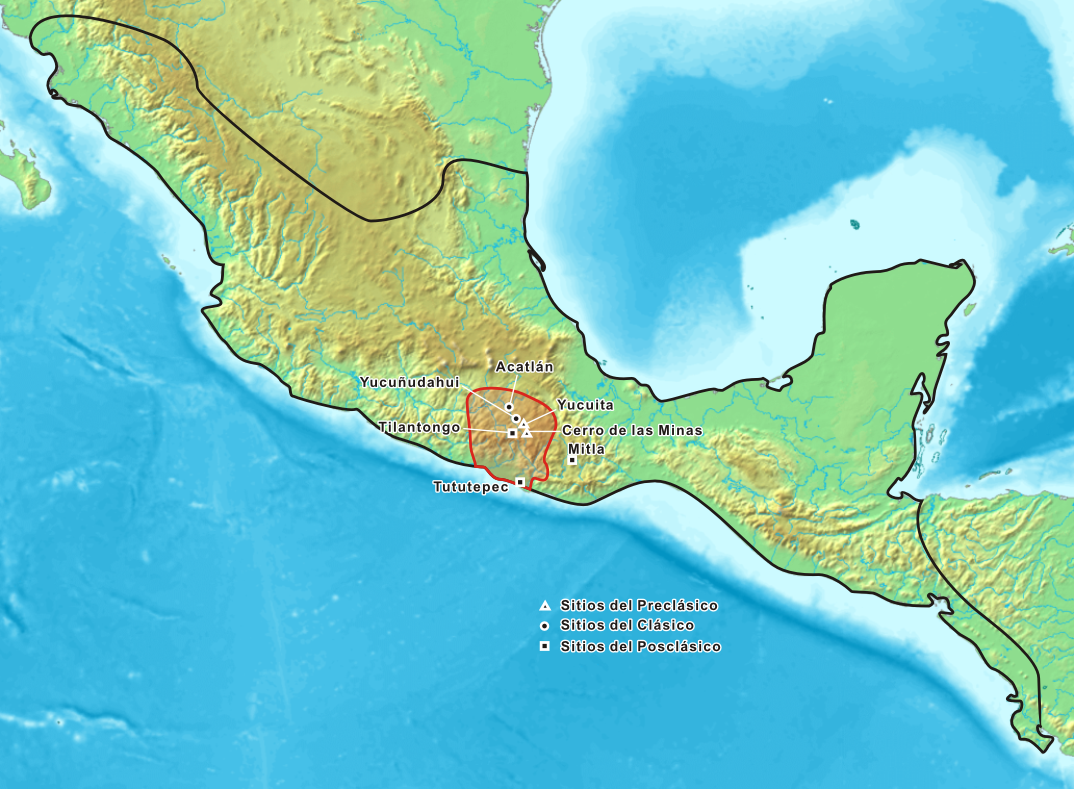
A map showing the Mixtecs. Pre-Classic areas are marked with a triangle, round dots mark Classic sites and Post Classic sites are marked with a square.

== Mixtec writing and codices ==
Mixtec writing is classified as logographic, meaning the characters and pictures used represent complete words and ideas instead of syllables or sounds. In Mixtec the relationships among pictorial elements denote the meaning of the text, whereas in other Mesoamerican writing the pictorial representations are not incorporated into the text. The characters used in Mixtec can be sorted into three types, pictographic symbols, ideographic symbols, and phonetic signs. Pictographic symbols can resemble the item they are intended to represent, and refer to one or more words. They are often found in person and place names. Ideographic symbols do not require knowledge of the Mixtec language to understand them, as they are found in other languages of the region and represent the idea which they are intended to portray. These symbols may also be referred to as ideograms or ideographs. The phonetic symbols used in Mixtec are important to the meaning of the words in which they are used, because Mixtec language is tonal. A tonal language relies on differences and inflections in the tone of a word to reflect the meaning of that word. These phonetic symbols indicate the tone of the spoken word, or represent instead a homonym of the intended word.

The origin of the Mixtec writing system is unknown, but other Mesoamerican pre-Columbian writing systems, such as that of the Aztecs, are found to have similar traits. The Mixtec writing system is found on codices dating to the Post-Classic period preceding the arrival of the Europeans in 1520 AD. The Mixtec codices are writings recorded on decorated strips of bark and animal hide. The term codex (singular) is usually applied to bound books, though scholars use it to refer to Mesoamerican writings. The codices are constructed by folding bark over to form an accordion-like book, or by covering strips of bark and leather with plaster to form a smooth writing surface.

Common topics found in the codices are biographies of rulers and other influential figures, records of elite family trees, mythologies, and accounts of ceremonies. Content of the biographic codices may be biased, as the subject individual might dictate the events and information they wished to be included, and it has been found that consulting additional codices allows better examination of the person or region from the different events and accounts portrayed.

Some examples of surviving Mixtec writing lie in the Codex Zouche-Nuttall, which is now preserved in the British Museum. The Codex Zouche-Nuttall records a multitude of Mixtecan events, including some of the Mixtecan conquests between the 11th and 12th centuries, as well as some of the alliances forged. Despite this, it was made sometime in the 14th century.

After the arrival of the Spanish in 1520 AD, the Mixtec writing system became hybridized with European writing styles and motifs. Some of these codices include European glosses, which facilitates translation when applied to the codices of the pre-Columbian period. Others show alphabetic writing replacing the pictorial traditional writing. Only indigenous authors participated in this hybrid style of writing, while Spanish writers used strictly European writing methods, reflecting their role as conquerors. The function of the codices changed during this period too; the ritual and divinatory aspects of the codices disappeared, while genealogical and culture records were maintained. New genres developed as a result of Spanish sponsorship, as they commissioned Mixtec authors to record information about the people and their past.

In addition to being used as a tool for colonial power, Mixtec writings were admissible legal documents. Mixtec writings during the Colonial period were used to document and legitimate land claims of the hereditary nobility and to preserve and maintain the Mixtec culture. Origin myths continued to be recorded as part of genealogical records. The Church, knowing of the religious motifs and creation myths recorded in these codices, confiscated and destroyed them; it is believed many more codices were in existence before the Colonial period.

== Calendar ==
Like most other Mesoamerican cultures, the Mixtec people had a 260-day sacred calendar. The days that made up this calendar were represented in Mixtec writing by the combination of a numeral, called the coefficient, and a certain sign or symbol. This numeral ranges between one and thirteen, while there are 20 signs which progress from crocodile to flower. The calendar moves in such a way that the numbers and signs move in parallel, so they start on crocodile, and move onto two Wind and three House. However, after thirteen Reed, the number resets, giving the next sign (which is a Jaguar at this point) an assigned coefficient of one. However, when seven flower is reached, the signs reset, but the coefficient continues to rise, giving eight crocodile. Years worked differently on the Mixtec calendar, and there were only four signs used to denote actual year-lengths. These were rabbit, reed, flint, and house. It was these signs and symbols that allowed Mixtec history to be traced to almost as far back as 940 CE, because the Mixtecs dated many important events with these signs and coefficients.

== Present day ==
Today the codices are studied for their importance to the ethnohistory of the Mixtec and the region. Ethnohistoric data gathered from these codices can be applied and compared with other codices, European writings and records of events, and with the archaeological data of the Post-Classic and Colonial periods. In addition to these other materials, the study of Mixtec codices is supplemented by consulting the Mixtec who live in the areas featured in the writings. Examining the oral traditions associated with the codices provides a more complete understanding of the information and stories they hold, as they were often used for recitations and readings.

During the twentieth century there was a resurgence in traditional writings across Mexico, coinciding with the Mexican Revolution and the emerging theme of national identity and unity. Today, the number of Mixtec speakers is around half a million people, spread across Mexico and the United States. Efforts by linguists, anthropologists, and Mixtecs are helping to preserve the language despite the influences of Spanish and English. Maintenance of the codices and the traditions they represent help modern Mixtecs to preserve and reclaim their historical traditions, and legitimize their culture with a positive identity of indigenous culture.

== See also ==
- Mixtec Group : Codex Vindobonensis Mexicanus I, Codex Selden, Codex Zouche-Nuttall, Codex Waecker-Gotter, Codex Colombino-Becker.
- Mixtecan languages
- Mesoamerican writing systems
- Mesoamerican calendars
- Mayan hieroglyphs
