= Cerro de las Minas =

Coordinates: 17°48′14″N 97°46′33″W

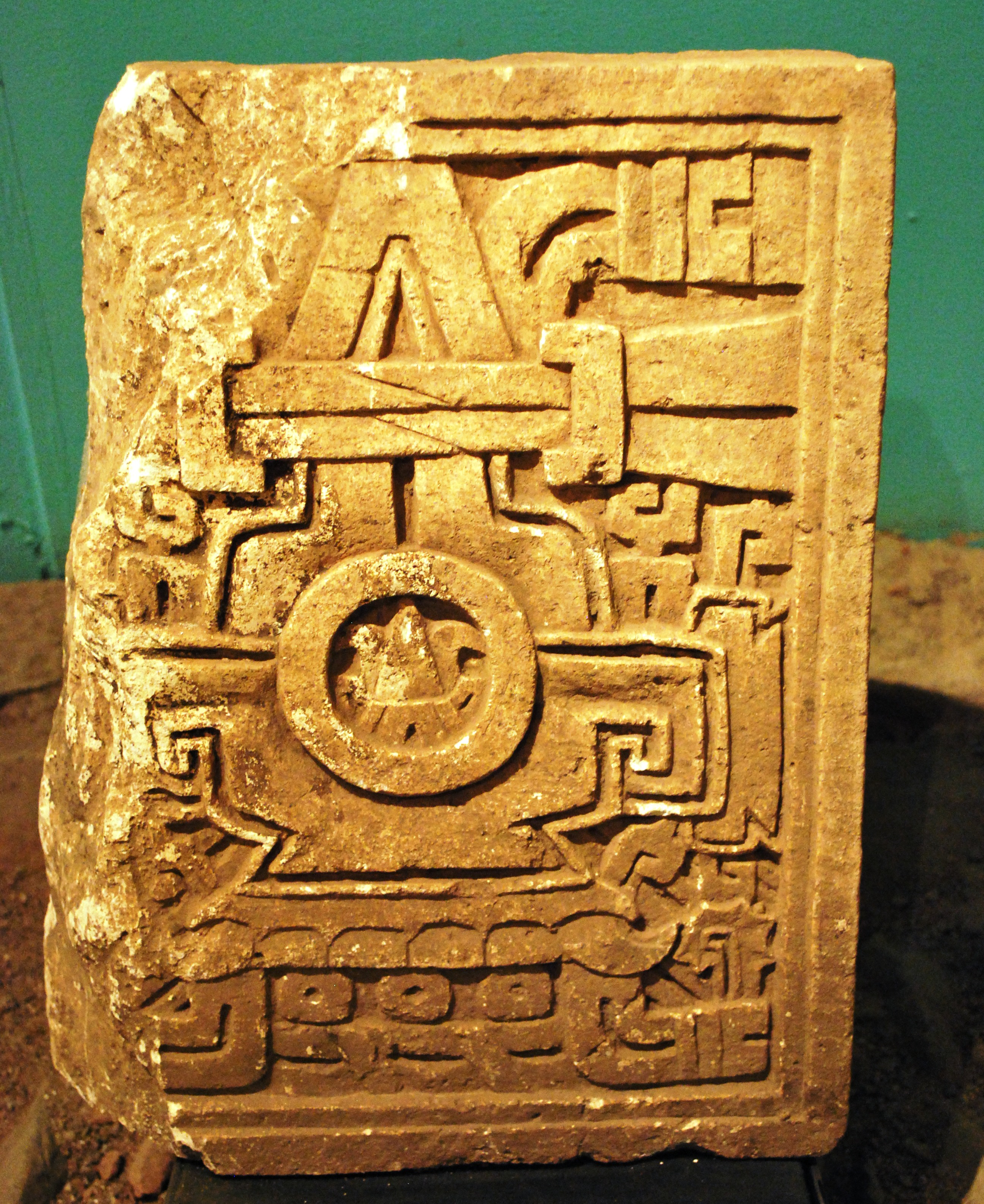
Tombstone found in Cerro de las Minas.

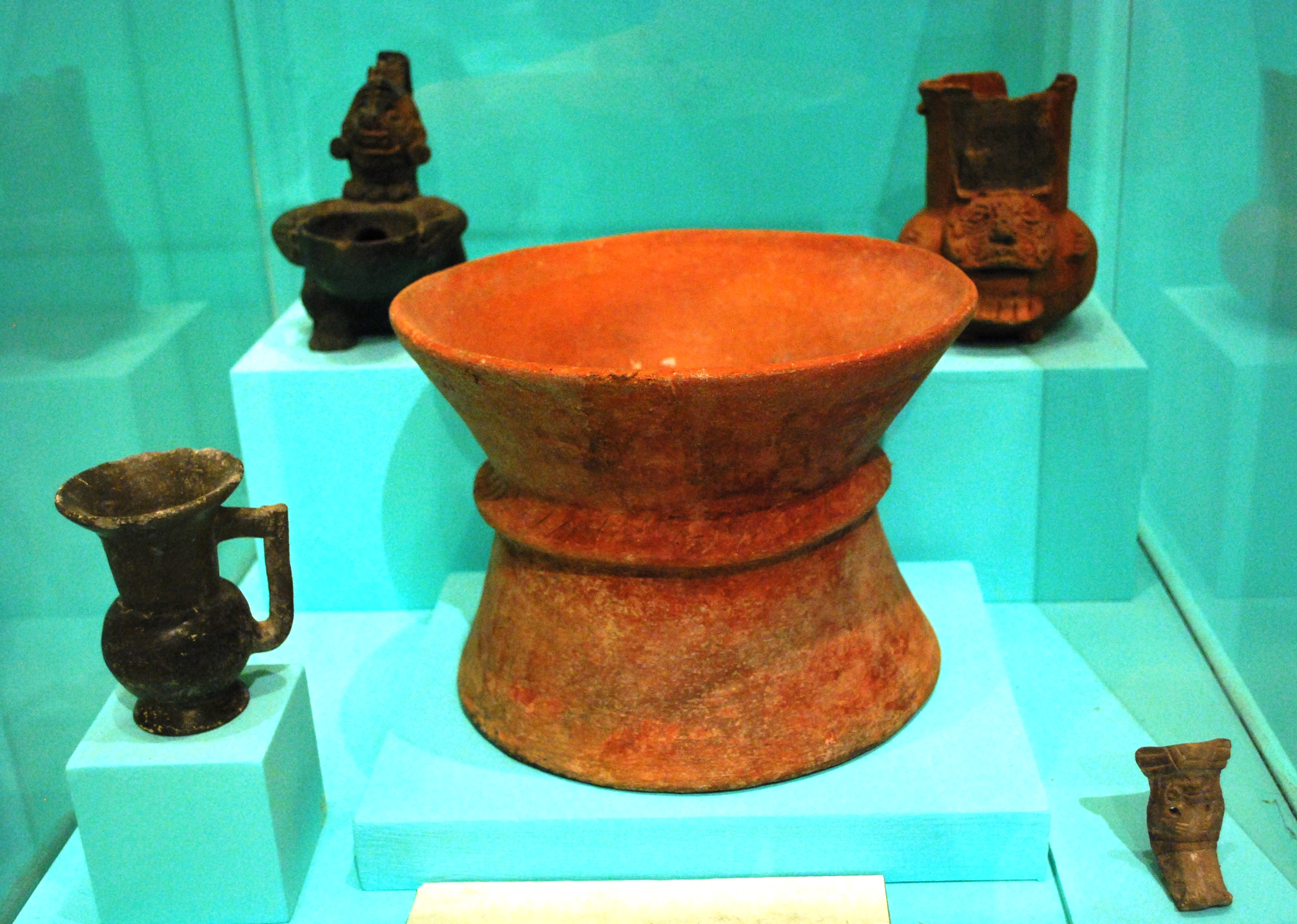
Ceramics from Cerro de las Minas site

Cerro de la Minas is an archaeological site located in the modern state of Oaxaca, just to the north of the city of Huajuapan de León. The site belongs to what is called the Ñuiñe, or lowland/hot lands Mixtec cultural area. The site is located on a hill that dominates the Valley of Huajuapan, in what are now the neighborhoods of Chapultepec, Santa Rosa, Alta Vista and Del Maestro of the city. This large hill is in a strategic position over the farmlands of the valley, which provided it with its food, as well as the trade routes that cross this valley, which made it regionally important. The site contains a number of settlements and was reserved for the elite of that area during that time. Cerro de las Minas is the only lowland Mixtec archeological site open to the public.

== Background ==
This site was systematically explored by Dr. John Paddock in the 1960s. He defined the Ñuiñe culture; further extensive works were carried out by Dr. Marcus Winter in 1987.

== Site History ==
2500 Years ago, there were many Mixtec communities (Mixteca Alta y Baja) inhabited by mixtec peoples called Ñuu Yata Yata (ancient people). These groups lived in Cerro de las Minas, Diquiyú and Tequixtepec (Mixteca Baja); Huamelulpan, Monte Negro, Yucuita and other (Mixteca Alta). The culture developed for 600 years, up to 250-350 CE, probably due to Teotihuacan influence would later transform into the Ñuiñe culture. Was an important Ñuiñe culture center, founded in the late Preclassic period, its apogee occurred during the early classic period, between 400 and 800 CE, during this period flourished other major cities such as Monte Alban and Teotihuacan, the latter in the Highland Valley Mexico.

The area fell on the trade routes between the Valley of Mexico and the central valleys of Oaxaca, the Valley of Tehuacán and other areas of the Sierra Madre del Sur. Commerce through here dealt in obsidian, ceramics, textiles, metals, salt, wood, charcoal, plants, fruit, and copal.

The development of this site from a village to a city is divided into two phases:

=== Ñudee Phase ===
The first is called Ñudee (the Mixtec name for Huajuapan, meaning “place of the brave”) and covers the period from 400 BCE to 250 CE. The site was founded in the late Preclassic period by people who originated from the Santa Teresa site, two km to the south.

=== Ñuiñe Phase ===
The second phase is called Ñuiñe and covers the site as a city-state from between 250 CE to about 800 CE. In both these phases, cultural influences from other Mixtec and Mesoamerican areas can be seen. It was the economic, political and cultural center of an area with a radius of about 10 to 15 km . Population peak of the site itself was between 1,000 and 2,000 people.

Its apogee was reached in the Classic period with the development of the Ñuiñe culture among the lowland Mixtec in general, which had its own architecture, writing, ceramics, figurines and urns.

Starting from 800 CE, the city went into decline, possibly due to being subjugated from a neighboring dominion. The area would not grow again until after the Spanish Conquest, with the founding of the Spanish city of Huajuapan in the valley area below, next to the river. This settlement was established in 1525.

Cerro de las Minas has characteristics similar to cities in the Mixteca Alta. Characterized by a construction of buildings around several squares, the rest of the population distributed around these plazas. (Mixtec urban design differentiation from other cities in which the buildings were organized around a single, large square). The construction areas were modified with terraces, called coo yuu (Mixtec name for terraces). It can be translated as “clay Dyke”, for this reason it was necessary to build stairs around the town. Cerro de las Minas was decorated with reliefs of inscriptions, using (a not very well known) writing system, called ñuiñe. The writing system is very similar to Monte Alban (Zapotec) inscriptions, which suggests a strong relationship between the valleys and the Mixteca Baja during the classical period.

== Site Description ==
Most of the site covers about fifty hectares on the top and down the sides of the large hill although in 2007, INAH found a pre-Hispanic tomb at the foot of the Cerro de la Minas. The hill was chosen as it was defensible. The center of the site is dominated by three mounds that measure about eight meters high and forty meters in diameters. These form a line through the center of the sites and have large platforms built among them, extending for a total of about 180 meters. In addition, there is a Mesoamerican ball court that measures sixty meters long and fifteen meters wide. The sides of the hill have been terraced to create more flat spaces for a market, the palace and some residential areas.

The residential areas generally contain foundations of stone, with walls of stone or adobe. Later homes built here have thinner walls made with flagstone filling in the gaps from the larger stones. Residential buildings situated in dominant positions have gravesites. This seems to be related to more modern Mixtec burial traditions, especially for those in high or preferred positions in society.

The palace is divided into rooms, a central patio and a large tomb, Number 5. This tomb contains three major burials, probably related to the ruling family. A total of nine tombs were discovered, some had been robbed but in other were found human remains, vessels and gravestones with the names of the deceased. In addition to these, more than 100 ordinary graves were found.

== Findings ==
Major investigation and excavation of the site was carried out in the late 1980s and early 1990s by a team of 200 people headed by Marcus Winter. Much of what little is known of this Mixtec region comes from finds at this site, especially finds related to the Mixtec glyph writing system. Most of the finds were contained in Tomb 5, located south of the main plaza in the palace complex. This tomb contained a large quantity of Mixtec ceramics as well as a multicolored urn with a representation of the god of wind or fire, with a brazier on its head, seated on a platform decorated with four glyphs. This piece is now on display at the Museum of Oaxaca. Most of the Ñuiñe writing has been found in this tomb, on gravestones. This kind of Ñuiñe writing contains a central glyph, usually the name of the deceased accompanied by dates. Two gravestones of this type were found in Tomb 5 and were probably of the governors of the city. It is the same writing system that was found in San Pedro y San Pablo Tequixtepec about 25 km to the north of the site, in the form of inscriptions under painted battle scenes were found. Tomb three was found to have been already sacked, but it still contained fragments of an urn and a carved stone.

Cultural elements found here show contact and influence from other Mixtec settlements such as Diquiyú, Monte Negro, Huamelulpan, Yucuita and Yucuñudahui. Despite six years of excavation, the site is still not completely explored; however, funds have not been secured to continue work at the site.

== Structures ==
=== Structure H1A ===
Covers the width of the Hill Summit; There was a structure, probably a temple. Access was via a wide staircase.

=== Mound 1 ===
Yet to be explored, has a stairway that probably lead to a temple over (on top) the mound.

=== Mound 2 ===
It is a large platform with vertical walls and flat surface. Probably had residences at the northeast side, has not been determined what buildings were constructed on the platform.

=== Main Plaza ===
Located between mounds 1 & 2, Tomb 5 Patio is located here, surrounded on three sides by residential structures, there are basement remains of rooms and patios.

=== Tomb 5 ===
Contained remains of several people, more than 70 vessels and a beautiful ñuiñe URN. Late walls of the Tomb patio show construction techniques (block – stone slab), and of slope-panel. In the patio is another housing area, designated area C.

=== Ballgame Court ===
Beside 2 mound, remains of a structure were found, possibly a Ballgame Court (I Shaped). The evidence is unclear, only some indications are preserved and houses were built over these (Ñuiñe late phase); the elongated shape and two small engraved stones suggest its use as a court, before construction of the Houses.

=== Mound 3 ===
Yet to be explored, the space between mounds 2 and 3, without residential houses, as the Tomb 5 patio, it is believed to have been a Tianguis (market).

=== Huajuapan Community Museum ===
Pieces found on site are exhibited in this Museum, others in the Oaxaca Cultures Museum and the Mitla Frissell Museum
