= Carl Bovallius =

Swedish biologist and archaeologist

Carl Erik Alexander Bovallius
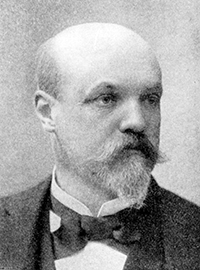
- Born: 31 July 1849; Stockholm, Sweden
- Died: 8 November 1907 (aged 58); Georgetown, Guyana
- Occupation(s): biologist, archaeologist

Carl Erik Alexander Bovallius (or Bowallius) (31 July 1849 – 8 November 1907) was a Swedish biologist and archaeologist.

== Biography ==
Carl Bovallius was born at Stockholm, Sweden. He was the son of Robert Mauritz Bowallius (1817–1902). His father was a historian and National Archivist 1874–1882.

Bovallius became a student in Uppsala University in 1868, and received a Ph.D. in 1875. That same year he was appointed associate professor and assistant professor at the zoological museum and zootomics laboratory. From 1889 and 1891 he held the professorship in zoology. During the 1870–1880, he conducted several European research trips, for scientific purposes, including travel along the Swedish and Norwegian coasts.

In 1881–83, he made zoological and ethnographic studies in Latin America, to where he returned in the late 1890s. Starting in 1881, Carl Bovallius explored Central America, and especially Nicaragua, in search of ancient sites. He studied archaeological site at Ometepe, and Zapatera, and also researched the ethnography of local tribes. A species of snake, Rhinobothryum bovallii, is named in his honor.

During the period 1888–1893, he made several extensive hiking trips in Norrland and Lapland. In 1892–93, he was commissioner of the Swedish department of the Historical American Exposition held in Madrid (Exposición Histórico-Americana de Madrid).

From 1897 to 1900, on behalf of an English company, he made extensive trips to Venezuela, Guyana, Brazil, the Caribbean, and Central America to study rubber forests. He established a cocoa plantation at Trinidad in 1901 and in 1904 became director of a rubber company in British Guiana. In 1904 he began new journeys in Guyana and Brazil. The ethnographic and archeological collections from his travels in Central and South America are at the Museum of Ethnography, Sweden.

== Selected works ==
- Om balanidernas utveckling (1875)
- Vandringar i Talamanca (1884)
- En resa i Talamanca-indianernas land (1885)
- Mimonectes sphaericus (1885)
- Nicaraguan Antiquities (1886)
- Amphipoda Synopidea (1886)
