= San Martín Huamelulpan =

- Interactive map of San Martín Huamelulpan
- Coordinates: 17°33′N 97°25′W
- Country: Mexico
- State: Oaxaca
- Time zone: UTC-6 (CST)

San Martín Huamelulpan is a town in the State of Oaxaca, Mexico, but it is better known simply as Huamelulpan. It is located just off Federal Highway 190. It is a small community of only 250 people whose main occupation is subsistence farming and fruit orchards. It is 2,218 meters above sea level with a temperate to cold climate and surrounded by pine trees.

The town promotes ecotourism, especially hiking and horseback riding. About a half a kilometer from the town is located a notable archeological site. This place used to be an important city during the Pre-classic and Classic periods of Mesoamerica. Still visible are terraced fields, plazas, ball fields, tombs and residential areas.
