= Mixtec =

Ethnic group

Mixtec Ñuù savi
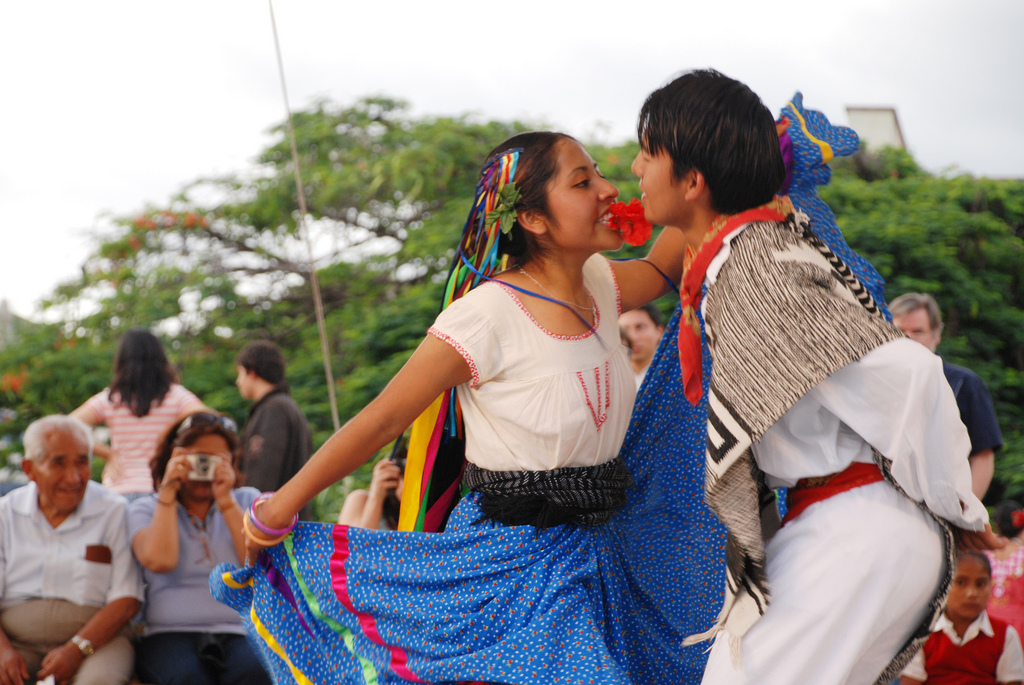
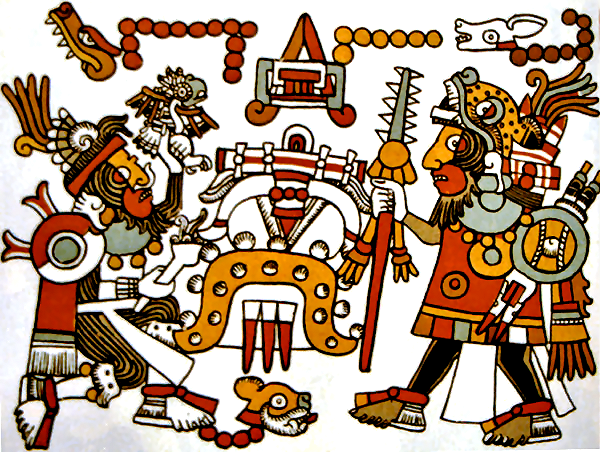
- Above: Dancing the jarabe mixteco in Oaxaca. Below: Mixtec king and warlord Eight Deer Jaguar Claw (right) Meeting with Four Jaguar, in a depiction from the pre-Columbian Codex Zouche-Nuttall.

Total population
- Approximately 830,000

Regions with significant populations
- Mexico (Oaxaca, Puebla, Guerrero, Chiapas); United States

Languages
- Mixtec, Spanish

Religion
- Roman Catholicism with elements of traditional beliefs

Related ethnic groups
- Zapotecs, Trique

- People: Mixtec ñuù savi, nayívi savi, ñuù davi, nayivi davi
- Language: Mixtec sa'an davi, da'an davi, tu'un savi,..
- Country: Mixteca; Ñuu Savi, Ñuu Djau, Ñuu Davi,..

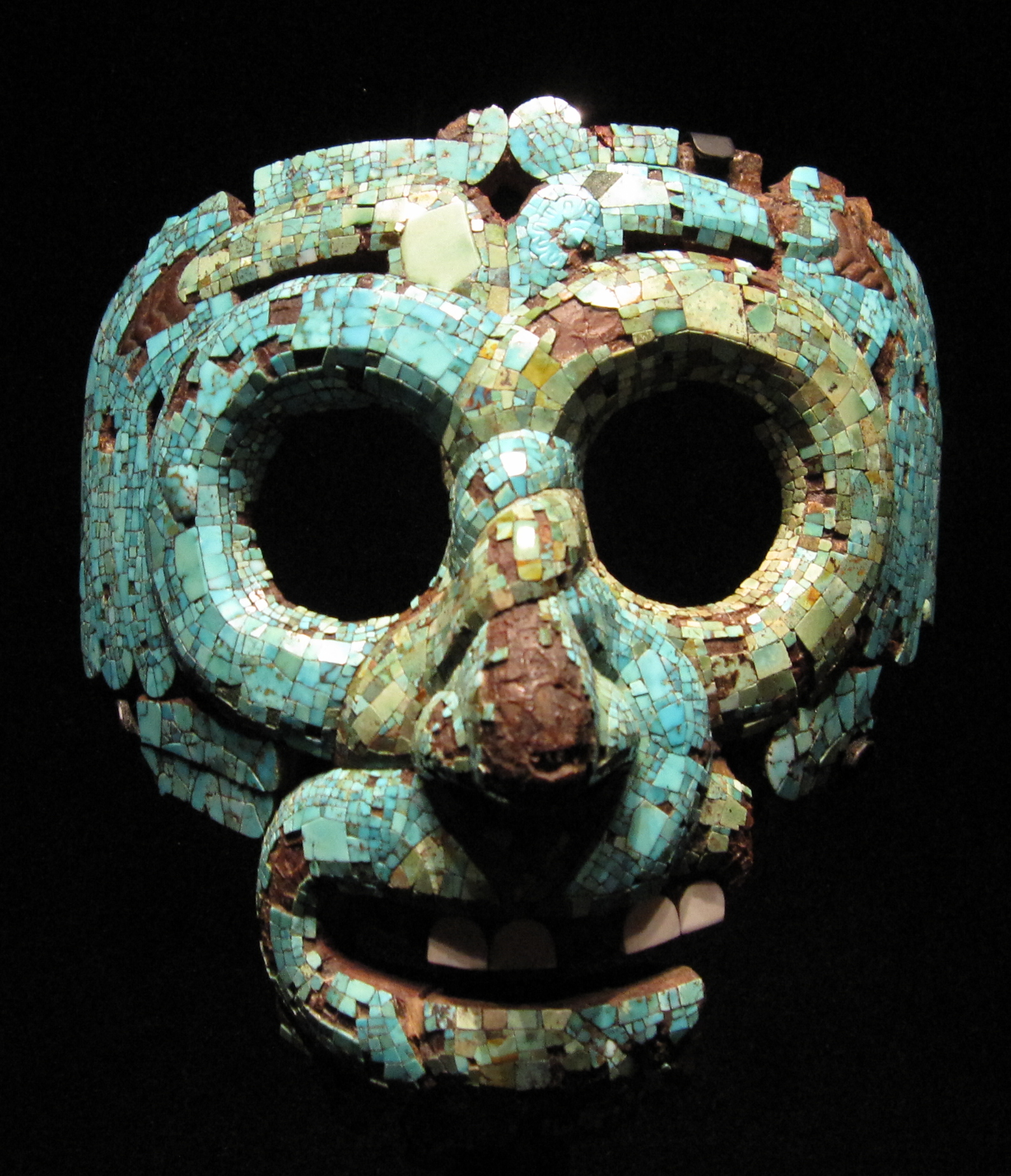
Turquoise mosaic mask. Mixtec-Aztec, 1400–1521 AD

The Mixtecs (/ˈmɪstɛks, ˈmɪʃ-/ MIS-teks, MISH-) or Mixtecos (Spanish pronunciation: [misˈtekos] – from Nahuatl mixtēcatl [miʃteːkatɬ]; Mixtec: ñuudzahui 'people of Dzahui') are Indigenous Mesoamerican peoples of Mexico inhabiting the region known as La Mixteca of Oaxaca and Puebla as well as La Montaña Region and Costa Chica Regions of the state of Guerrero. The Mixtec culture was the main Mixtec civilization, which lasted from around 1500 BCE until being conquered by the Spanish in 1523 CE.

The Mixtec region is generally divided into three subregions based on geography: the Mixteca Alta (Upper Mixtec or Ñuu Savi Sukun), the Mixteca Baja (Lower Mixtec or Ñuu I'ni), and the Mixteca Costa (Coastal Mixtec or Ñuu Andivi). The Alta is drier with higher elevations, while the Baja is lower in elevation, hot but dry, and the Costa is also low in elevation but much more humid and tropical. The Alta has seen the most study by archaeologists, with evidence for human settlement going back to the Archaic and Early Formative periods. The first urbanized sites emerged here. Long considered to be part of the larger Mixteca region, groups living in the Baja were probably more culturally related to neighboring peoples in Eastern Guerrero than they were to the Mixtecs of the Alta. They even had their own hieroglyphic writing system called ñuiñe. The Costa only came under control of the Mixtecs during the military campaigns of the Mixtec cultural hero Eight Deer Jaguar Claw. Originally from Tilantongo in the Alta, Eight Deer and his armies conquered several major and minor kingdoms on their way to the coast, establishing the capital of Tututepec in the Lower Río Verde valley. Previously, the Costa had been primarily occupied by the Chatinos.

In the pre-Columbian era, some Mixtec kingdoms competed and allied with each other and with Zapotec kingdoms in the Central Valleys. Like the rest of the Indigenous peoples of Mexico, the Mixtecs were conquered by the Spanish invaders and their Indigenous allies in the 16th century. Pre-Columbian Mixtecs numbered around 1.5 million. Today there are approximately 800,000 Mixtec people in Mexico, and there are also large populations in the United States. The Mixtec languages form a major branch of the Oto-Manguean language family.

== Nomenclature and etymology ==
The term Mixtec (Mixteco in Spanish) comes from the Nahuatl word mixtecah [miʃˈtekaʔ], "cloud people". There are many names that the Mixtecs have for naming themselves: ñuù savi, nayívi savi, ñuù davi, nayivi davi. etc. All these denominations can be translated as 'the land of the rain'. The historic homeland of Mixtec people is La Mixteca, called in Mixtec language Ñuu Savi, Ñuu Djau, Ñuu Davi, etc., depending on the local variant. They call their language sa'an davi, da'an davi or tu'un savi.

== Overview ==
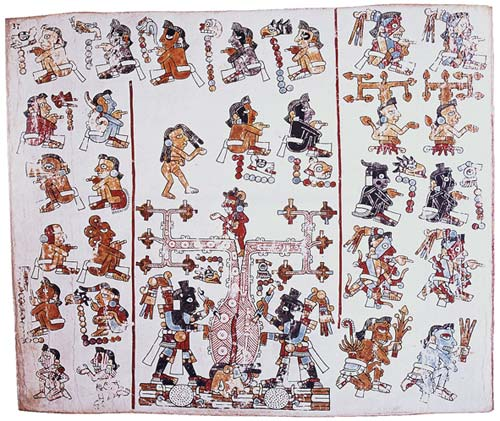
Plate 37 of the Codex Vindobonensis. The central scene supposedly depicts the origin of the Mixtecs as a people whose ancestors sprang from a tree.

In pre-Columbian times, the Mixtec were one of the major civilizations of Mesoamerica. Important ancient centers of the Mixtec include the ancient capital of Tilantongo, as well as the sites of Achiutla, Cuilapan, Huajuapan, Mitla, Tlaxiaco, Tututepec, Juxtlahuaca, and Yucuñudahui. The Mixtecs also made major constructions at the ancient city of Monte Albán (which had originated as a Zapotec city before the Mixtecs gained control of it). The work of Mixtec artisans who produced work in stone, wood, and metal was well regarded throughout ancient Mesoamerica.

According to West, "the Mixtec of Oaxaca...were the foremost goldsmiths of Mesoamerica," which included the "lost-wax casting of gold and its alloys."

At the height of the Aztec Empire, many Indigenous people in Oaxaca, including the Mixtecs and Zapotecs, would suffer at the hands of the Aztecs. In the 1450s, Mixtecs would be weakened after the Aztec armies crossed the mountains into the Valley of Oaxaca with the intention of extending their hegemony. Aztec forces triumphed over the Mixtecs in 1458. In 1486, the Aztecs established a fort on the hill of Huaxyácac (now called El Fortín), overlooking the present city of Oaxaca, which allowed the Aztecs to enforce tribute collection from the Mixtecs and Zapotecs. However, not all Mixtec towns became vassals. The Mixtecs put up some resistance to Spanish forces led by Pedro de Alvarado. However, they would be subdued by the Spanish and their central Mexican allies led by Francisco de Orozco in 1521. Upon Orozco's arrival to the Valley of Oaxaca on November 25, 1521, the Mixtecs would be peacefully submit to Spanish rule, though some resistance would continue in Antequera before ending by the end of 1521.

Mixtecs have migrated to various parts of both Mexico and the United States. In recent years a large exodus of Indigenous peoples from Oaxaca, such as the Zapotec and Triqui, has seen them emerge as one of the most numerous groups of Amerindians in the United States. As of 2011, an estimated 150,000 Mixteco people were living in California, and 25,000 to 30,000 in New York City. Large Mixtec communities exist in the border cities of Tijuana, Baja California, San Diego, California and Tucson, Arizona. Mixtec communities are generally described as transnational or trans-border because of their ability to maintain and reaffirm social ties between their native homelands and diasporic communities. (See: Mixtec transnational migration.)

== Mixtecs in the colonial era ==
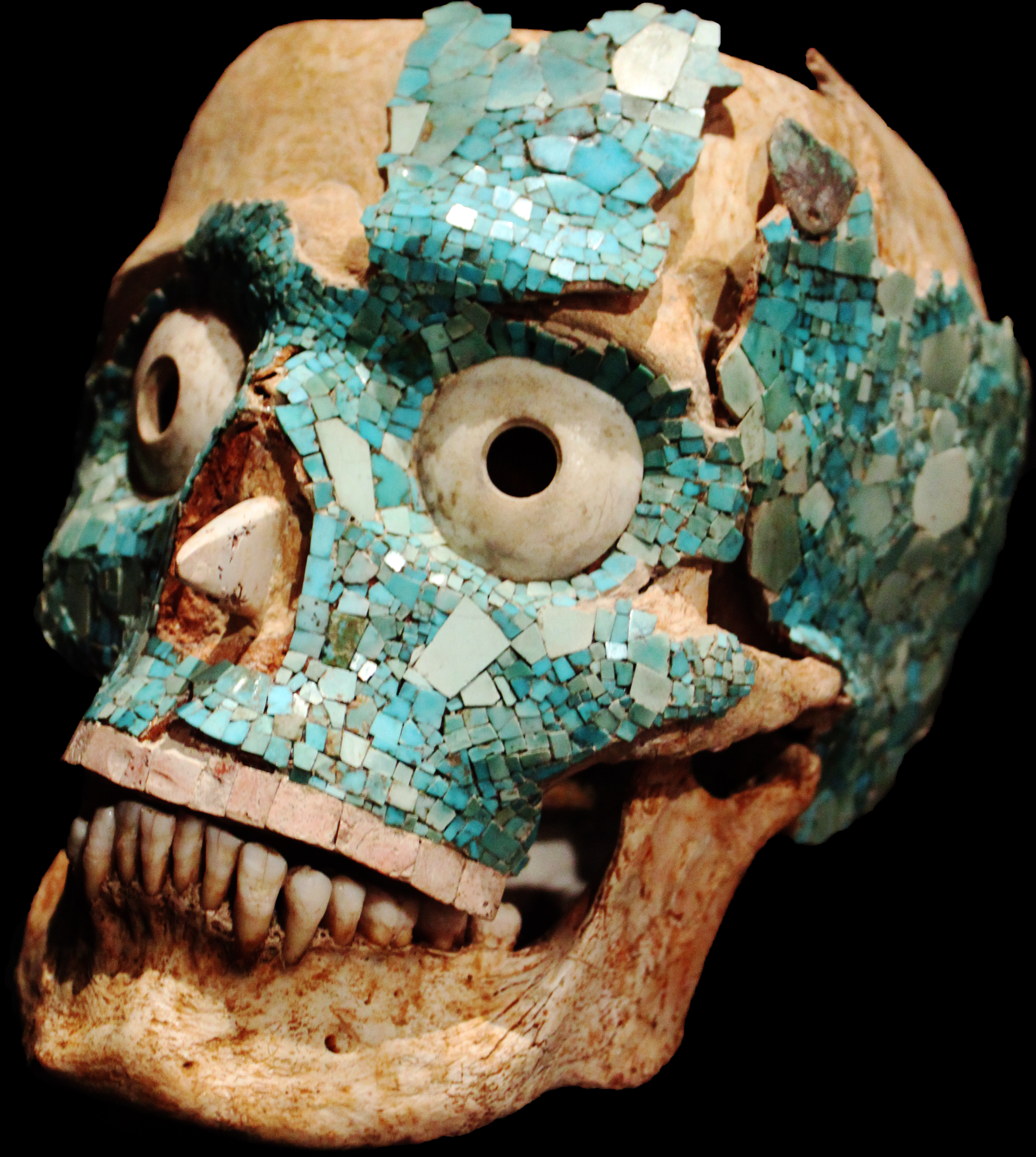
Mixtec funerary mask; Grave No. 7, Monte Alban; Museum of Cultures of Oaxaca.

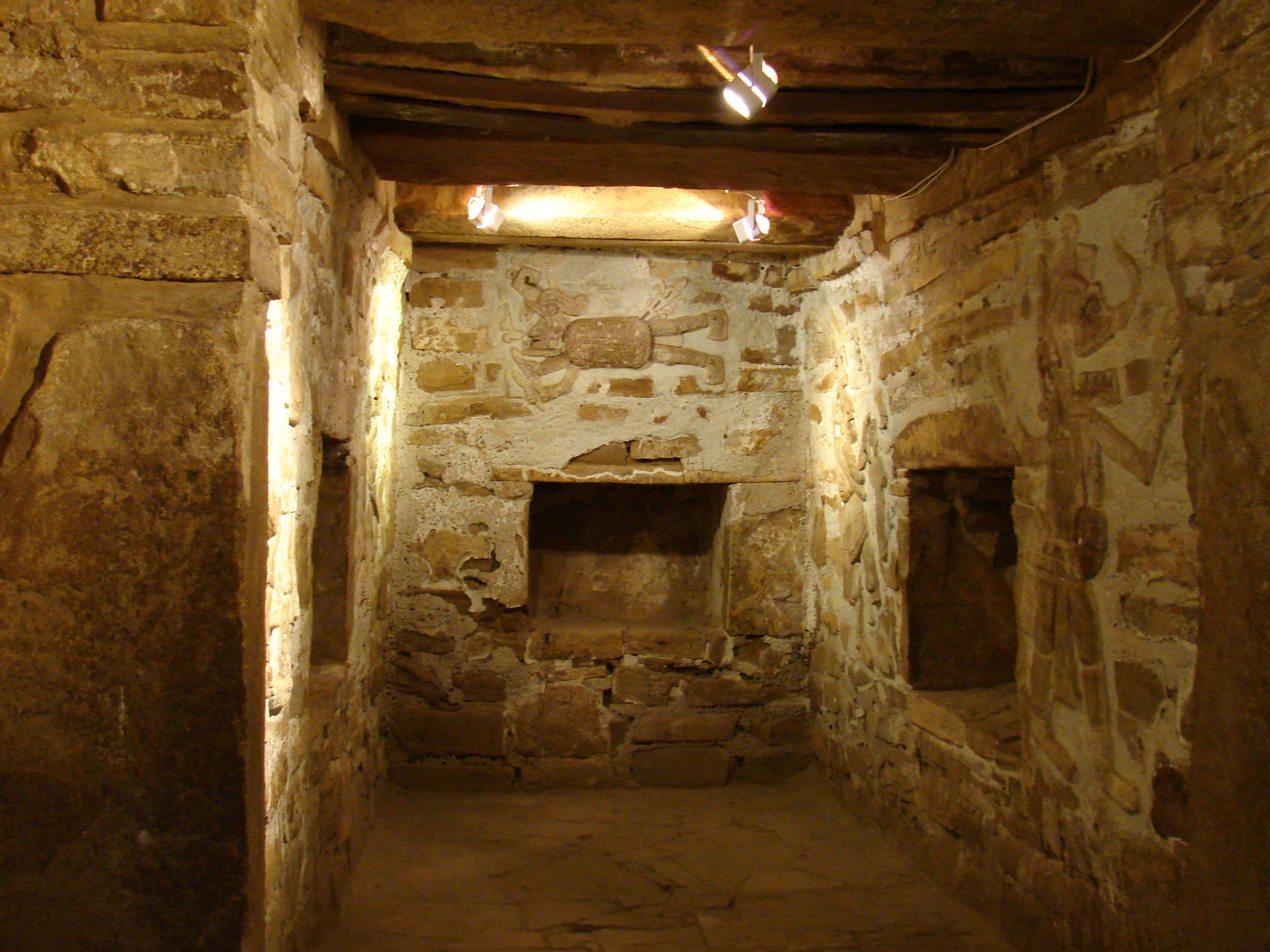
The stucco reliefs in the Tomb 1 of Zaachila (The Valley, Oaxaca) reveal a remarkable influence from Mixtec art. The tomb likely belongs to a person whose name is registered in the Nuttall Codex. Tomb 1 of Zaachila, Central Valleys of Oaxaca, Late Postclassic.

There is considerable documentation in the Mixtec (Ñudzahui) native language for the colonial era, which has been studied as part of the New Philology. Mixtec documentation indicates parallels between many Indigenous social and political structures with those in the Nahua areas, but published research on the Mixtecs does not primarily focus on economic matters. There is considerable Mixtec documentation for land issues, but sparse for market activity, perhaps because Indigenous cabildos did not regulate commerce or mediate economic disputes except for land. Long-distance trade existed in the prehispanic era and continued in Indigenous hands in the early colonial. In the second half of the colonial period, there were bilingual Mixtec merchants, dealing in both Spanish and Indigenous goods, who operated regionally. However, in the Mixteca “by the eighteenth century, commerce was dominated by Spaniards in all but the most local venues of exchange, involving the sale of agricultural commodities and Indigenous crafts or the resale of imported goods.”.

Despite the development of a local exchange economy, many Spaniards with economic interests in Oaxaca, including “[s]ome of the Mixteca priests, merchants, and landowners maintained permanent residence in Puebla, and labor for the obrajes (textile workshops) of the city of Puebla in the sixteenth and seventeenth centuries was sometimes recruited from peasant villages in the Mixteca." There is evidence of community litigation against Mixtec caciques who leased land to Spaniards and the growth of individually contracted wage labor. Mixtec documentation from the late eighteenth century indicates that "most caciques were simply well-to-do investors in Spanish-style enterprises"; some married non-Indians; and in the late colonial era had little claim to hereditary authority.

== Geography ==
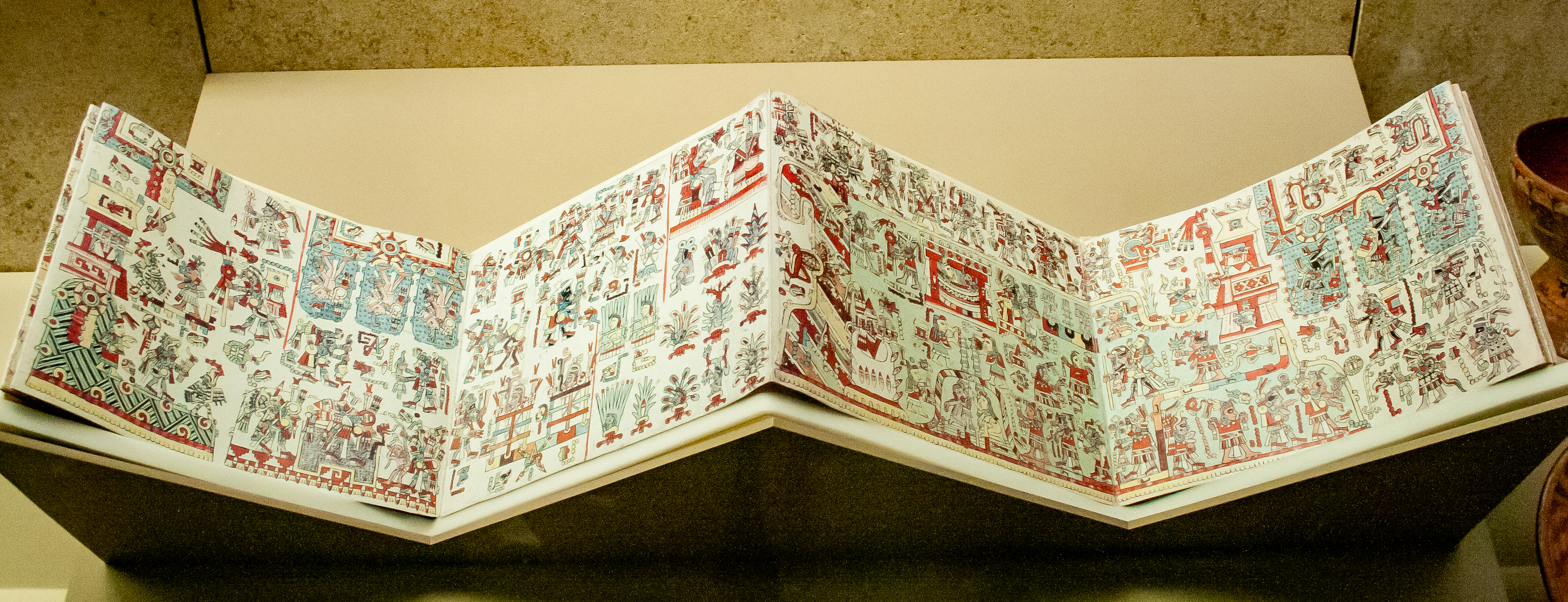
Codex Zouche-Nuttall Mixtec British Museum.

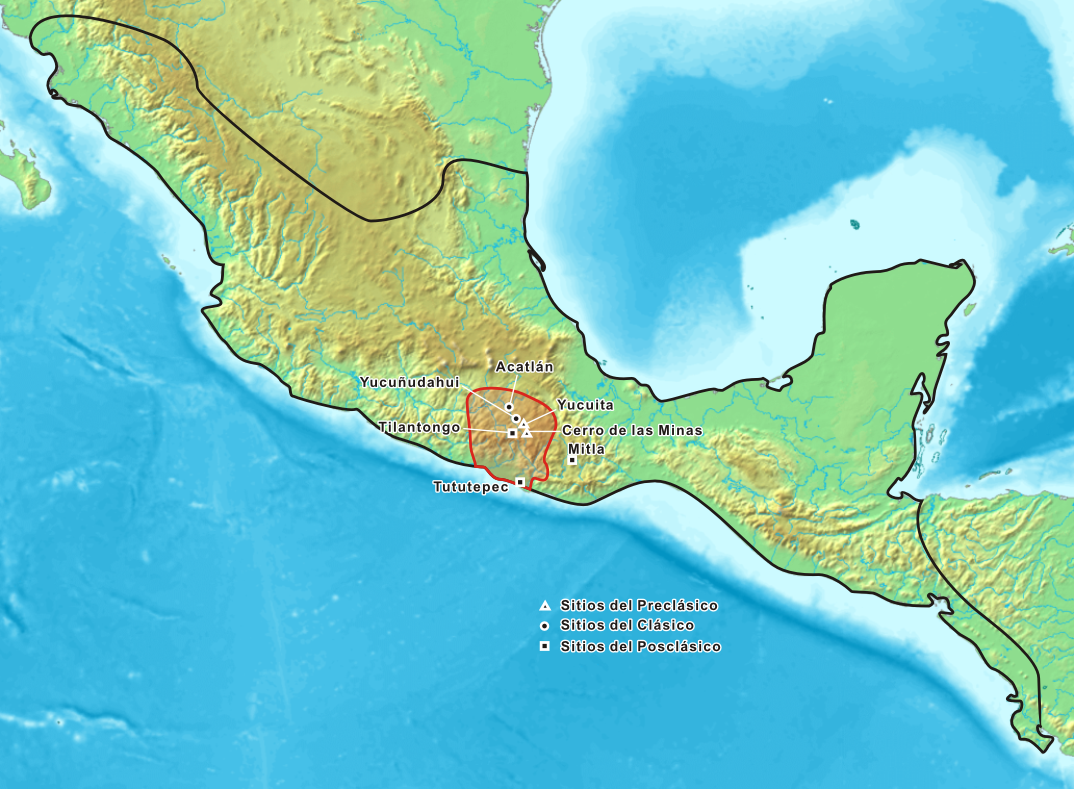
Map showing the historic Mixtec area. Pre-Classic archeological sites are marked with a triangle, Classic sites with a round dot, and Post-classic sites with a square.

The Mixtec area, both historically and currently, corresponds roughly to the western half of the state of Oaxaca, with some Mixtec communities extending into the neighboring state of Puebla to the north-west and also the state of Guerrero. The Mixtec people and their homelands are often subdivided into three geographic areas: The Mixteca Alta or Highland Mixtec living in the mountains in, around, and to the west of the Valley of Oaxaca; the Mixteca Baja or Lowland Mixtec living to the north and west of these highlands, and the Mixteca de la Costa or Coastal Mixtec living in the southern plains and the coast of the Pacific Ocean. For most of Mixtec history, the Mixteca Alta was the dominant political force, with the capitals of the Mixtec nation located in the central highlands. The valley of Oaxaca itself was often a disputed border region, sometimes dominated by the Mixtec and sometimes by their neighbors to the east, the Zapotec.

An ancient Coixtlahuaca Basin cave site known as the Colossal Natural Bridge is an important sacred place for the Mixtec.

== Language, codices, and artwork ==
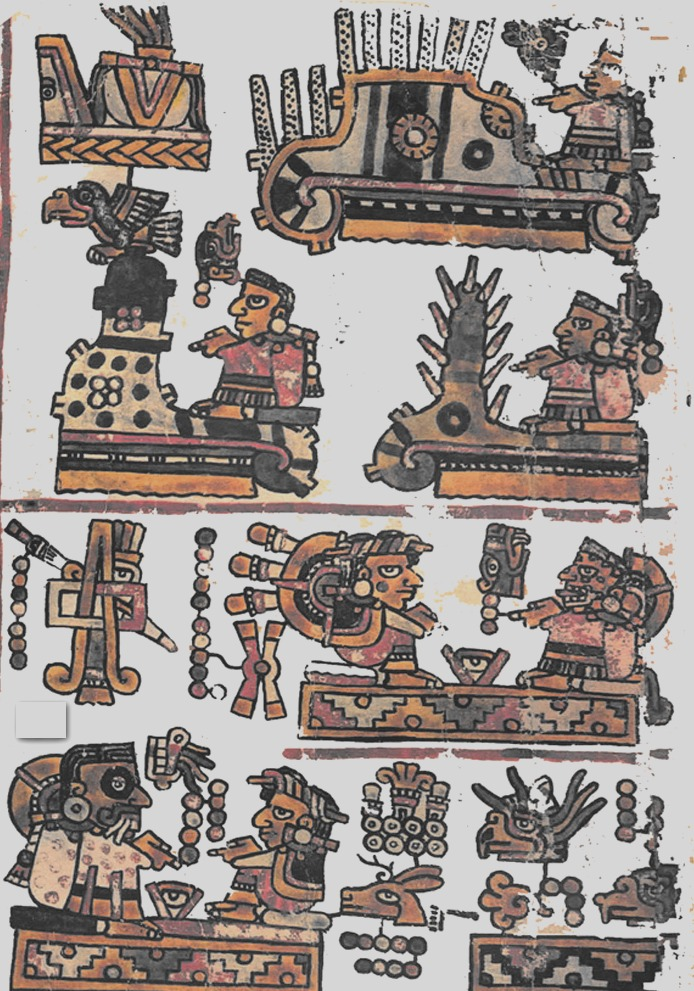
The preconquest Codex Bodley, page 21, names Lord Eight Grass as being the last king of Tlaxiaco.

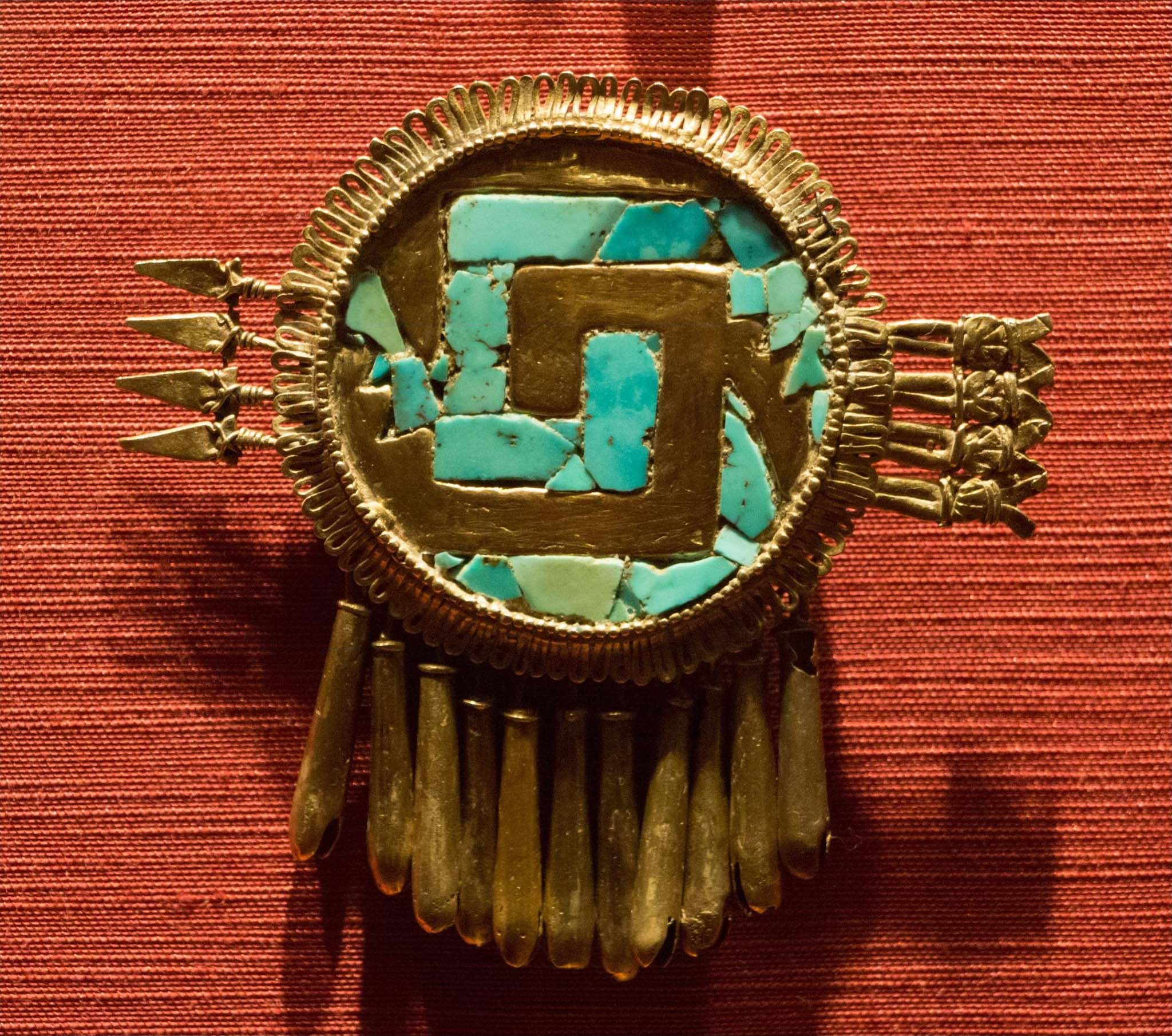
Shield of Yanhuitlan in the National Museum of Anthropology in Mexico city

The Mixtecan languages (in their many variants) were estimated to be spoken by about 300,000 people at the end of the 20th century, although the majority of Mixtec speakers also had at least a working knowledge of the Spanish language. Some Mixtecan languages are called by names other than Mixtec, particularly Cuicatec (Cuicateco), and Triqui (or Trique).

The Mixtec are well known in the anthropological world for their Codices or phonetic pictures in which they wrote their history and genealogies in deerskin in the "fold-book" form. The best-known story of the Mixtec Codices is that of Lord Eight Deer, named after the day in which he was born, whose personal name is Jaguar Claw, and whose epic history is related in several codices, including the Codex Bodley and Codex Zouche-Nuttall. He successfully conquered and united most of the Mixteca region.

They were also known for their exceptional mastery of jewelry and mosaic, among which gold and turquoise figure prominently. Products by Mixtec goldsmiths formed an important part of the tribute the Mixtecs paid to the Aztecs during parts of their history. Turquoise mosaic masks also played an important role in both political and religious functions. These masks were used as gifts to form political alliances, in ceremonies during which the wearer of the mask impersonated a god, and were fixed to funerary bundles that were seen as oracles.
