= Ometepe (archaeological site) =

Archaeological site in Nicaragua

Ometepe Island is an important archaeological site, located in the Lake Nicaragua in the Republic of Nicaragua, administratively belongs to the Rivas Department. Its name derives from the Nahuatl words ome (two) and tepetl (mountain), meaning two mountains, given that it is formed and practically the whole island is formed by two volcanoes: Concepción and Maderas.

== The Island ==
Ometepe has an area of 276 km². It is the largest volcanic island located within a lake. The population is estimated at 42,000. The island has two larger cities, Moyogalpa and Altagracia that also are the main access ports to the island. There are an enormous amount of prehispanic statues, petroglyphs and pottery found on the island, and the area is believed to be an important ceremonial center for its ancient inhabitants, as well as dozens of petroglyphs carved into stones and the surrounding bedrock.

=== History ===
There is evidence that the island was inhabited at least since 1500 BC. Apparently this population would be part of a migration movement originated in South America with final destination in Mexico. On the island found ceramic and large sculptures carved basalt rock have been found, that are exhibited today in the Park of Altagracia Church and the Managua National Museum. These sculptures are attributable to the same style as those found in the Zapatera Island by the Chorotega culture.

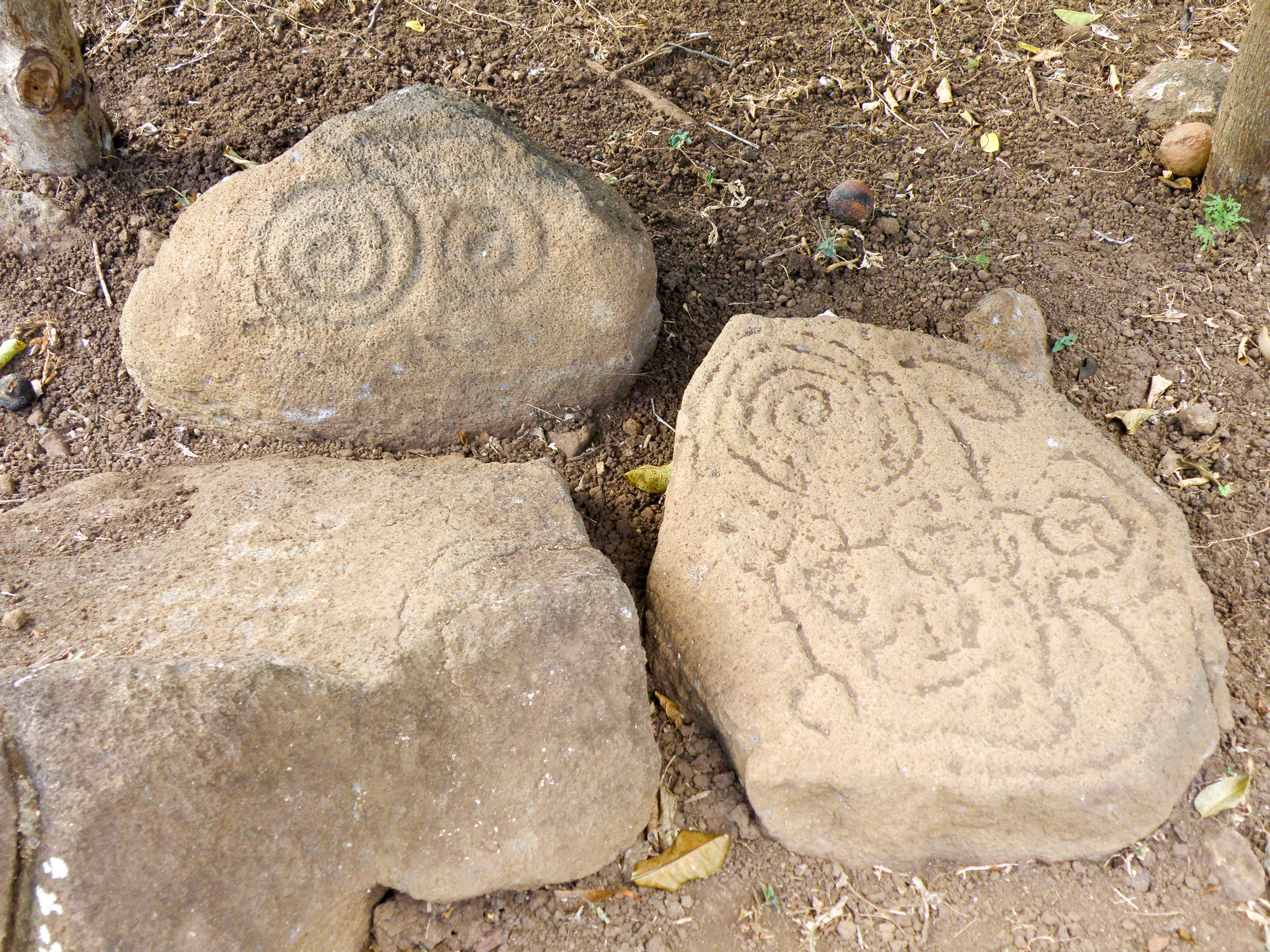
Ometepe petroglyphs found on the island.

Some petroglyphs were also found in the island made from 300 AD. Many of the petroglyphs include spirals. Others are used to depict the head of anthropomorphic figures, some of which resemble Mesoamerican depictions of Nagual, suggesting the shared practice of Tonal spirituality.

The conquistadores found the country occupied by numerous towns populated by the Nicarao people, dedicated to the practice of the arts and peaceful industries. Dr. Berendt, great explorer and scholar of Aboriginal people of Central America, in the light of philological results obtained by himself and American diplomat Ephraim George Squier (1849), and traditions preserved mainly from Oviedo, Torquemada and Herrera, believed that the Chorotegas, Cholutecas, Dirianes and Orotiñas were descendants of people that migrated from Cholula, Mexico. These people occupied the greater part of the country from the Gulf of Fonseca to Nicoya, its territorial continuity was interrupted in the vicinity of current Leon by the Marabios and again by an Aztec colony that occupied the narrowest part of the strip of land between the Pacific and the Nicaragua Lake and the lake islands. The King and the capital of this nation was named Nicarao (Conference read before the American geographical society, July 10, 1876, by Dr. C. H. Berendt). The former inhabitants of this region left abundant relics of their civilization in mounds, cemeteries, etc. (Bransford, J.F. 1881. Introduction, p. 4)

The first archaeological report on the Ometepe material came to light with the 1852 publication "Nicaragua, its people and landscapes" by American diplomat E. G. Squier, who explored the area in 1849.

In December, 1872, the Navy Department sent an expedition under the command of Commander E.P. Lull, USN, to Nicaragua, to complete the studies initiated in the spring of that year for an inter-oceanic canal. (For valuable information on the country, see the report published by the Navy Department, 1874 on studies for a canal through Nicaragua.) J.F Bransford, was a medical officer assigned to expeditions, with instructions to perform general scientific research on natural history, etc., of the country. He visited the Ometepe Island and while searching for antiquities, he managed by chance to see a ditch which had been recently excavated, in which were exposed funerary urns. This was an estate that belonged to don José Angel Luna, near Moyogalpa. (Bransford, J.F. 1881. Preliminary Note, p. 1)

In 1876, he was sent to Nicaragua in particular service related to the study, and was instructed to perform archaeological research in the Ometepe Island. He was in the country from January to mid-May, more than half the time exploring and digging in the island, having carried out the main portion of the work at the Luna Hacienda, Los Angeles and San Francisco. He was again in the island from February, 1877 and remained until the first of July. As before, most of the time was spent on the island, focusing in Santa Helena and Chilaite, north from Moyogalpa. Then some investigations were made in firm land near San Jorge, followed by a trip south to Nicoya in Costa Rica. (Bransford, J.F. 1881. Preliminary Note, p. 1)

For his part, Professor Carl Bovallius, arrived at Ometepe from Granada, on 1882–1883 New Year's Eve and stayed in the Moyogalpa village, on the northwest tip of the island. From there he took several trips in different directions, and although his zoological research occupied a lot of his time, he had numerous opportunities to perform archaeological excavations.
