= Zapatera (archaeological site) =

Archaeological site in Nicaragua

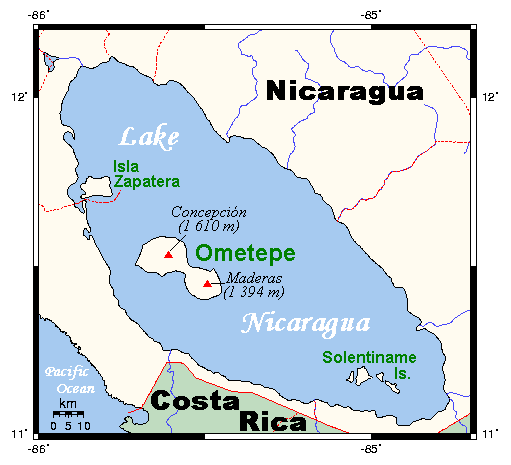

Highest point
- Elevation: 629 m (2,064 ft)
- Coordinates: 11°44′N 85°49′W

Geography
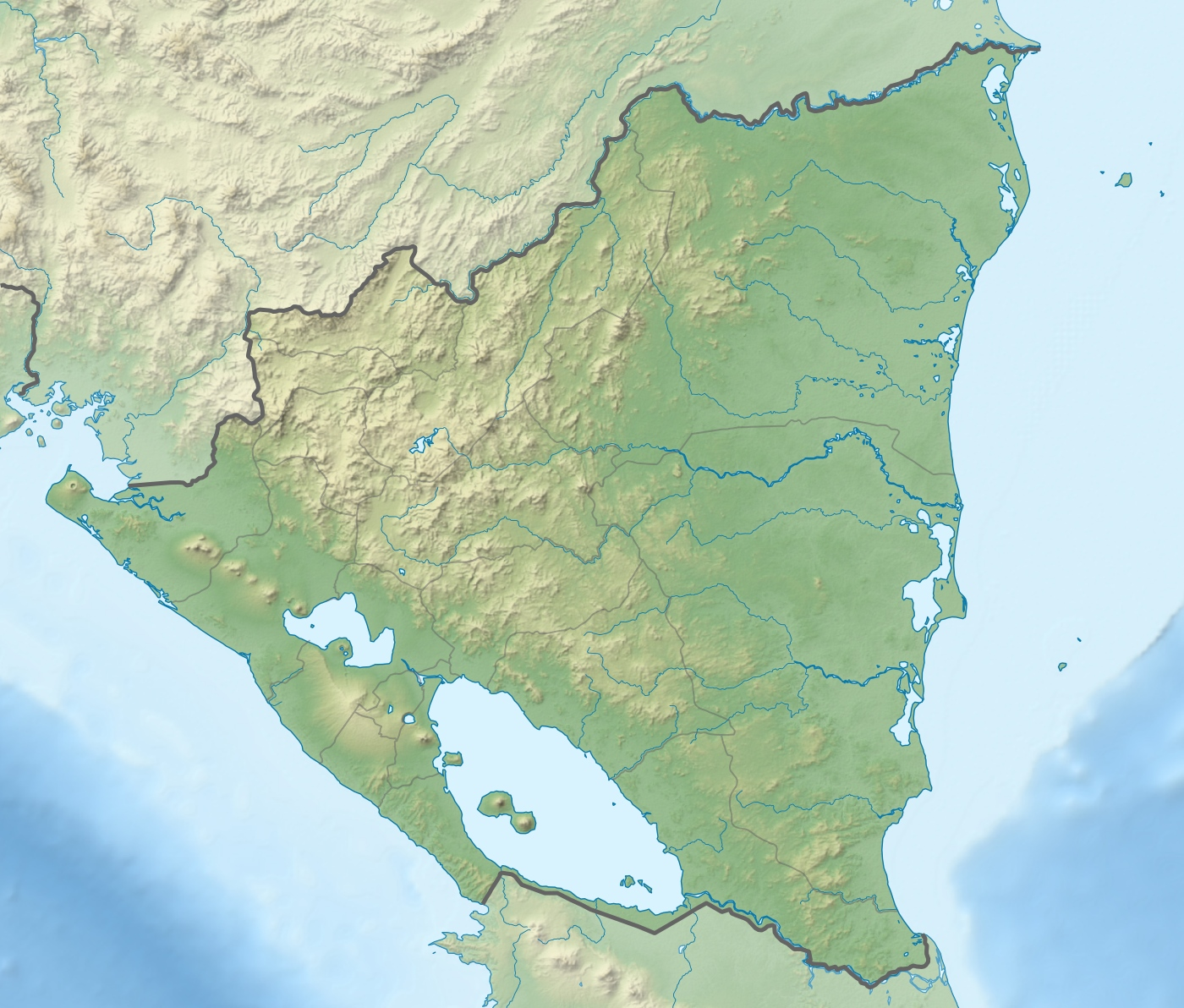
- Location within Nicaragua
- Location: Granada Department, Nicaragua

Zapatera is an archaeological site located on Isla Zapatera, a volcanic island in Lake Nicaragua, Granada Department, Nicaragua. The large quantity of statues, petroglyphs and pottery found at the site, and on other islands in the Zapatera archipelago, suggests the area was an important ceremonial centre of pre-Columbian Chorotega people between 800 and 1350 CE.

== Geography ==
Isla Zapatera is a dormant volcano 629 metres (2,064 feet) high, with an area of 52 square kilometres (20 square miles) – making it the second largest island in Lake Nicaragua, after Ometepe. It is situated in a relatively shallow and calm area of the lake known as Charco Muerto (Spanish: Dead Pond) and, at its closest point to the northwest, it is just 1 kilometre (0.6 miles) from the mainland. Zapatera and ten nearby islands and islets form the Zapatera archipelago.

== History ==
In 1849 Zapatera was visited by American diplomat and archaeologist Ephraim George Squier, who noted the presence of a considerable amount of statues and petroglyphs in an area known as Punta de las Figuras. More than 30 years later, in 1883, Squier's report encouraged Swedish naturalist Carl Bovallius to undertake a more extensive survey of the island. Bovallius discovered 25 statues in Sonzapote and a number of petroglyphs on the islet of La Ceiba. Mexican Felipe Pardines also published a series of articles on the El Muerto island petroglyphs in the 1930s. The most recent archaeological investigations were carried out in the 1980s and involved a number of small excavations, but an in depth study of the island is still lacking.

Looting and the removal of the archaeological remains has been a persistent problem at Zapatera. Almost all the statues have been removed from the island: a sizeable collection is preserved in San Francisco Convent Museum in Granada, but many others are used as ornament in state buildings or have found their way into the hands of private collectors. Smaller finds have also been largely dispersed into private or foreign museum collections.

== Finds ==
The statues and the majority of the petroglyphs and pottery at Zapatera have been dated to between 800 and 1350 CE, and is ascribed to the Chorotega, an indigenous Mesoamerican culture. Finds from this period also include utensils and zoomorphic figurines in a similar style to examples from the mainland. Some of the petroglyphs and pottery may date back as far as 500 BCE, and others are contemporary with Spanish colonies.

The most prominent finds from Zapatera were statues. According to records, they were carved of black basalt, generally between 1 and 2.25 metres (3 ft 3 in and 7 ft 5 in) high, and more than 150 centimetres (59 inches) in diameter. They depicted both humans and animals and are speculated to represent either deities or high-status individuals. Most are found around earthen or stone mounds, facing outwards, suggesting they formed part of a ceremonial installation. On the basis of engravings near these sites it has been proposed that they may have been host to human sacrifices.
