= Mixtec transnational migration =

Migration between Mexico and the US

Mixtec transnational migration is the phenomenon in which Mixtec people have migrated between Mexico and the United States for over three generations.

The Mixtec people are an example of a social group in which migration had not led to a loss of cultural identity, but has rather generated territorial expansion and cultural reaffirmation.

Mixtecs have migrated to various parts of both Mexico and United States. In recent years they, along with Zapotecs and Triqui, have emerged as one of the largest groups of migrants in the United States. Large Mixtec communities exist in the border cities of Tijuana and San Diego. According to statistics compiled by the National Geographic and Statistical Institute, out of the 241,080 Indigenous people living in the border cities, 72,000 (30 percent) are migrants. As of 2011, an estimated 150,000 Mixteco people were living in California, and 25,000 to 30,000 in New York City.

The migration of Indigenous populations to various cities of the United States constitutes an important source of income for the Mixtec, who have a long tradition of migration and are the most numerous in the United States according to the Mixtec Integrated Development Program. The remittances sent between 1984 and 1988 amounted to $2,000 million pesos annually. Mixtec communities are generally described as transnational and transborder because of their ability to maintain and reaffirm social ties between their native homeland and diasporic community. For more than two decades, anthropologists have documented people who move from one country to another and who build transnational links.

== Transnational migration ==
Nina Glick Schiller defines transnational as "those persons who having migrated from one nation-state to another live their lives across borders, participating simultaneously in social relations that embed them in more than one nation-state".

Lynn Stephen states that while the term transnational migration suggests a more or less permanent state of being between two or more locations, some people may spend a good part of their time in this state, others may live for longer periods of time in one place or another, and still others may leave their home communities only once or never. All the people living within a transnational social field are exposed, in different levels, but nonetheless in some shared way to "a set of social expectations, cultural values, and patterns of human interaction shaped by more than one social, economic and political system".

== Transnational social fields ==
By conceptualizing transnational social fields as transcending the boundaries of nation-states, individuals within these fields are, through their everyday activities and relationships, influenced by multiple sets of laws and institutions that exist within many states and cross their border. The national and the transnational part of migrant histories and experiences, particularly when it comes to the recognition or lack thereof of basic human and labor rights connected to their positions in the relation to the legal frameworks of the nations they are moving between Migrants Rights. When Mixtecs come into the United States, they cross a new set of regional borders that are often different from those in Mexico, but may also overlap with those of Mexico; for example, the racial/ethnic hierarchy of Mexico, which lives on in Mexican communities in the United States, including ethnic, cultural, and regional borders within the United States.

== Background ==
According to social researcher Laura Velasco-Ortiz, several decades of Mexican migration to the United States have led entire communities to concurrently develop economic, cultural, and social ties in the US and Mexico. Evidence also suggests that these migrant populations have modified the construction of the sense of territorial belonging historically associated as the foundation of local, regional, and national identities. Velasco-Ortiz proposes a reconceptualization between the relation culture-territory in the process of transnational migration among Mixtec communities.

== Mixtec identity ==
The use of ethnic labels has enabled migrant workers to distinguish themselves in local ethnic hierarchies and differentiate themselves from other Mexicans and Central-Americans. According to Michael Kearny, the use of pan-ethnic labels has also provided a way for so-called illegal or alien Mixtec migrants to construct a new form of identity based on their transborder existence. Mixtec identity arises as an alternative to nationalist consciousness and as a medium to circumscribe not space, but collective identity precisely in those border areas where nationalist boundaries of territory and identity are most contested and ambiguous. However, according to Lynn Stephen, culturally Mixtecs and other Indigenous migrants of Latin American origin are still not seen as part of the Mexican's state.

== History of Indigenous migration ==
Mixtec migration within Mexico in particular has been tied to the commercialization of Mexican agriculture beginning after World War II. For the past two decades, liberalization of trade barriers between Mexico and United States has made it much easier for US agricultural products to enter Mexico and for Mexican products to enter the United States. According to Melinda Burns, the Mixtecs form part of a de facto border exchange, one in which the U.S. exports cheap corn to Mexico and imports Mexican corn farmers to labor in the fields of California.

In most Oaxacan communities underemployment is high during the slack months of the agricultural year. The situation in many communities became dire in the 1990s as subsidies and credits for small farmers were significantly downsized; they had to compete with subsidized imported corn and other products that hit the Mexican market as a result of the North American Free Trade Agreement (NAFTA). According to Stephen, Indigenous migration became more significant with the recruitment of Oaxacan men by the U.S. bracero program during World War II and after. The Bracero Program was a guestworker program between Mexico and the US that was started because of a perceived labor shortage in the agricultural and railroad industry. Braceros were to work under contracts that specified their transportation, wages, health care, housing, food, and the number of hours to be worked. The contracts were initially between the US and Mexican governments, but they were switched to private contractors who ignored the terms. It is estimated that over 4.5 million contracts were issued. The bracero program ended in 1964, and many Oaxacans among them many Mixtecs continued to migrate.

The greatest concentrations of Indigenous migrants are in the states of California and Oregon. Stephen states that we can no longer think of the cultural and historical entity we call Mexico as existing solely below the Rio Grande and the rest of the physical border, in the past they were part of Mexican territory.

The increasing presence of Mexicans in both California and Oregon and their links to Mexico are important parts of the histories of transborder communities. The arrival of Mixtecs is essential to the history of active recruitment of Mexicans as farmworkers beginning in the early part of the twentieth century. Oregon has more than 100,000 farm-workers, 98 percent of whom are Latino and primarily of Mexican origin. The most recent farmworkers, many of whom live permanently in Oregon and should be considered immigrants workers, are Indigenous. The histories of Mexicans in California and Oregon, according to Stephen, are connected to the histories of places such as San Agustin, a Mixtec community in Oaxaca, through political, economic, and cultural connections. Martha Rees argues that the increase in number of female migrants to the United States is no longer a male strategy to reduce household expenses: "Migration is not solely a male strategy: in spite of low remittances, the number of migrants is positively related to consumer goods. Not all migrants cut themselves off from their families, not all operate solely as free agents or individuals, but remain tied to their household and communities through reciprocal relations".

== Migrant life ==
Indigenous migrant and immigrant workers often try to remain invisible in the larger world to avoid detention and deportation by the U.S. Customs and Border Protection. According to Stephen, migrants are also objects of surveillance and invisibility on the US-Mexico border, the agricultural fields and in produce processing plants. Racialized readings of Mexican Indigenous immigrants and migrants as illegal, undocumented or not, result in surveillance from many people in the United States, from border guards to factory supervisors. Being an object of surveillance in the United States for one's legal status is a contradictory framework because of the encouragement of undocumented immigration through US immigration policy, as Stephen explains: "U.S. immigration policy in relation to Mexico and other countries has served primarily as labor policy, inviting workers in when they are needed and then showing them the door when it became politically expedient to 'defend' the border."

While US immigration policy has consistently maintained the defense of the border from so-called illegal aliens, deeper historical analysis of particular policies directed toward Mexico—for example, the bracero program of 1942–64, the IRCA, and the SAW program of 1986 and a close examination of the accelerated integration of the US and Mexican economies under economic neoliberalism and NAFTA—suggests that U.S. immigration policy toward Mexico has encouraged and facilitated increased immigration

According to the Department of Labor, about 53 percent of farmworkers in the United States are undocumented. In California, estimates are as high as 90 percent.

The media has created an anti-immigrant message in the United States that portrays Mexicans as illegal aliens who are invading this country and taking away many sources of employment. Especially after the September 11 attacks, the immigrant population has been a target of racism as Stephen asserts that what initially was a legal and cultural label (undocumented/illegal Mexican immigrant) became racialized as images of supposed illegal aliens that depicts the loss of control, invasion, danger, and war. Indigenous workers who are continuously seen as dark and illegal become subject to treatment that is justified by their appearance. Indigenous migrant workers have a strong sense of continually being seen as other and different in Oregon and California by non-Mexicans as Mexican immigrants increase in numbers.

An important development among Indigenous migrants was the Bi-National Mixtec-Zapotec Front, which has sought the support of the Mexican Government and international donor agencies to improve the respect for human and labor rights since 1991. The Frente Indigena de Organizaciones Binacionales (FIOB) has expanded the dialogue on Indigenous issues beyond national borders between Mexico and the US, as well as among Mexico, Guatemala, and Belize. According to Stephen, the FIOB publicly constructs its identity by linking local, regional, national, and transborder or binational dimensions of Indigenous identity with a multi-sited understanding of location.

Remittances are an important source of income in developing countries. According to the International Forum on Remittances, "remittances are part of the centuries-old pattern of migration from rural to urban areas. Nowadays, remittances represent the human face of globalization, in which millions of people migrate in search of a better life and in order to provide for their loved ones back home. These flows of human and financial capital have profound implications for the economies and societies of the sending and the receiving countries." Mixtec migrants send money back to their country of origin in a variety of ways. Where available, they may use formal channels such as banks and money transfer services. Digital border crossing is often an important part of transborder communities; outside of electronic money transfers and ATMs, little attention has been paid to how digital communication has entered the lives of transborder migrants in maintaining their family relationships, in cross-border political organizing, solidarity, human rights defense, and in the construction of ethnic identities.

Immigrant uses of digital technologies across borders have been described as "virtual diasporas" by Laguerre; no virtual diaspora can be sustained without real life diasporas and it is not considered a separate entity, but rather a pole of a continuum. According to Stephen, through their digital productions invoking both the rootedness of place and place-based histories, and transborder and transhistorical presences, Indigenous activists in FIOB have constituted their own identities of contemporary Indigenous Mexican identity.

== Family role ==
Similar to other immigrant groups, transnational Mixtec communities undergo a process in which they adapt to American society and urban life. For the Mixtec community in Linda Vista, San Diego, for example, native families adjust to living in apartment complexes, learn to utilize domestic appliances such as the gas stove and the refrigerator, use public transportation, buy their produce at a grocery store, and send their children to American public schools. However, they seek to reproduce traditional communal life as much as possible, in part because cohesion is a protection strategy against an unknown and aggressive urban environment.

Mixtecs practice a gendered division of labor, in which women are in charge of the house and the children, and men are the breadwinners. However, due to the high cost of living, many Mixtec women in transnational communities are forced to join the labor force either next to the men, working as agricultural laborers in the fields or as domestic workers in the homes of middle and upper class American families. Despite women's progressively increased participation in salaried work, Mixtec communal tradition still dictates that domestic chores (cooking, cleaning, washing clothes, dishwashing, childcare, healthcare and religiosity) remain women's work.

Mixtec female sacrality is reflected in everyday ordinary activities such as cleaning, food preparation, bathing, childcare, parenting and communal interaction, as well as in more formal rituals such as Day of the Dead, Temascalli (vapor) baths, the anniversaries of patron saints, and celebrations of births, baptisms, weddings, and funerals. For the Mixtec people, community is the highest expression of divinity.
