= Conservation and restoration of Mesoamerican codices =

Conservation and restoration of Mesoamerican codices is the process of analyzing, preserving, and treating codices for future study and access. It is a decision-making process that aims to establish the best possible methods and tools of preservation and treatment. The conservation-restoration of Mesoamerican literature is essential for understanding the ancient civilizations of Mexico. Efforts of restoration have proved difficult due to their fragility and importance of preserving historical and evidential value. Non-invasive technologies have been a more recent advancement, making analysis and treatment of pre-Hispanic codices a delayed process. As analysis continues, digitization has also been a more recent and valuable means of making information accessible to a wider audience, thus contributing to further research and preservation.

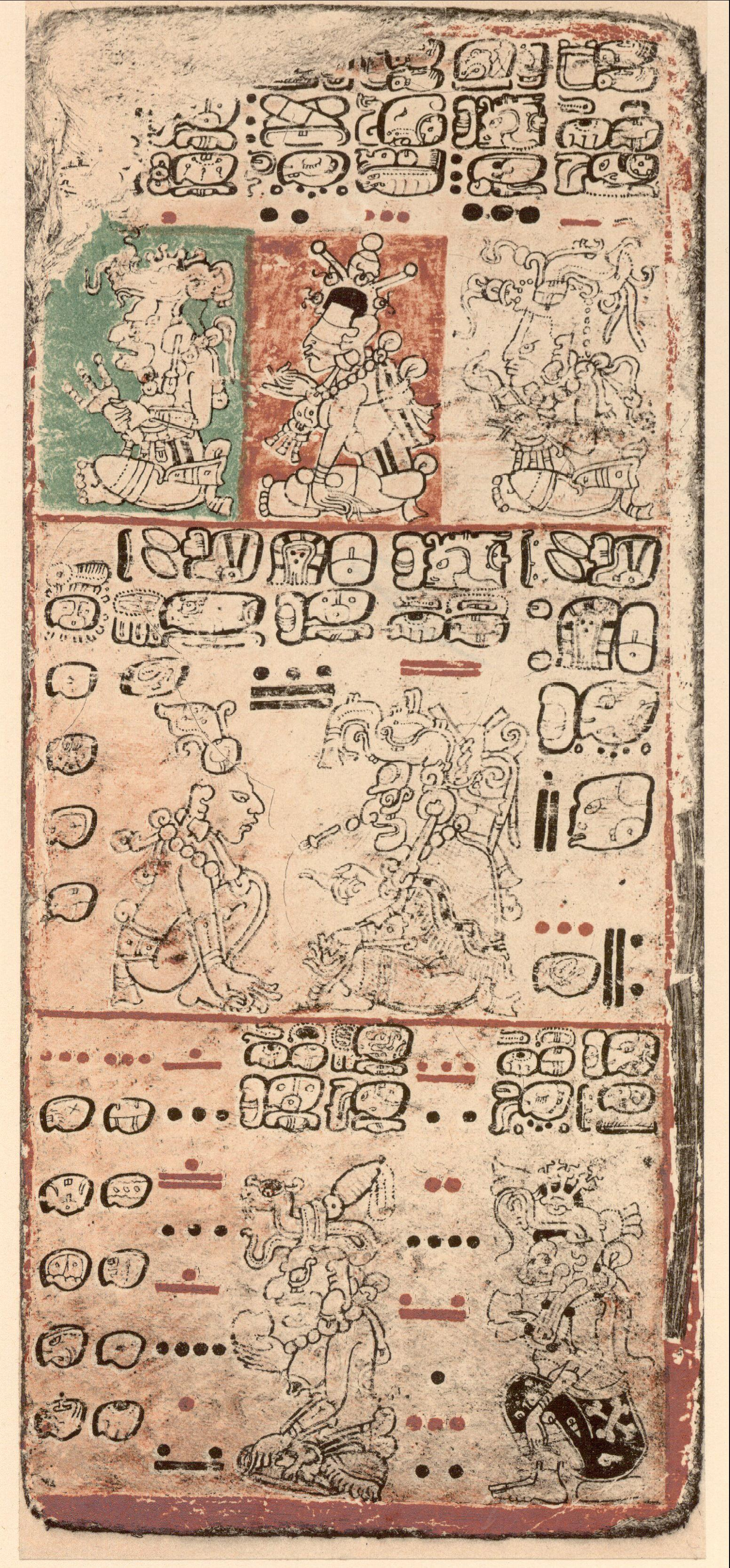
A page of the Precolumbian Mayan Dresden Codex

== Extant codices ==
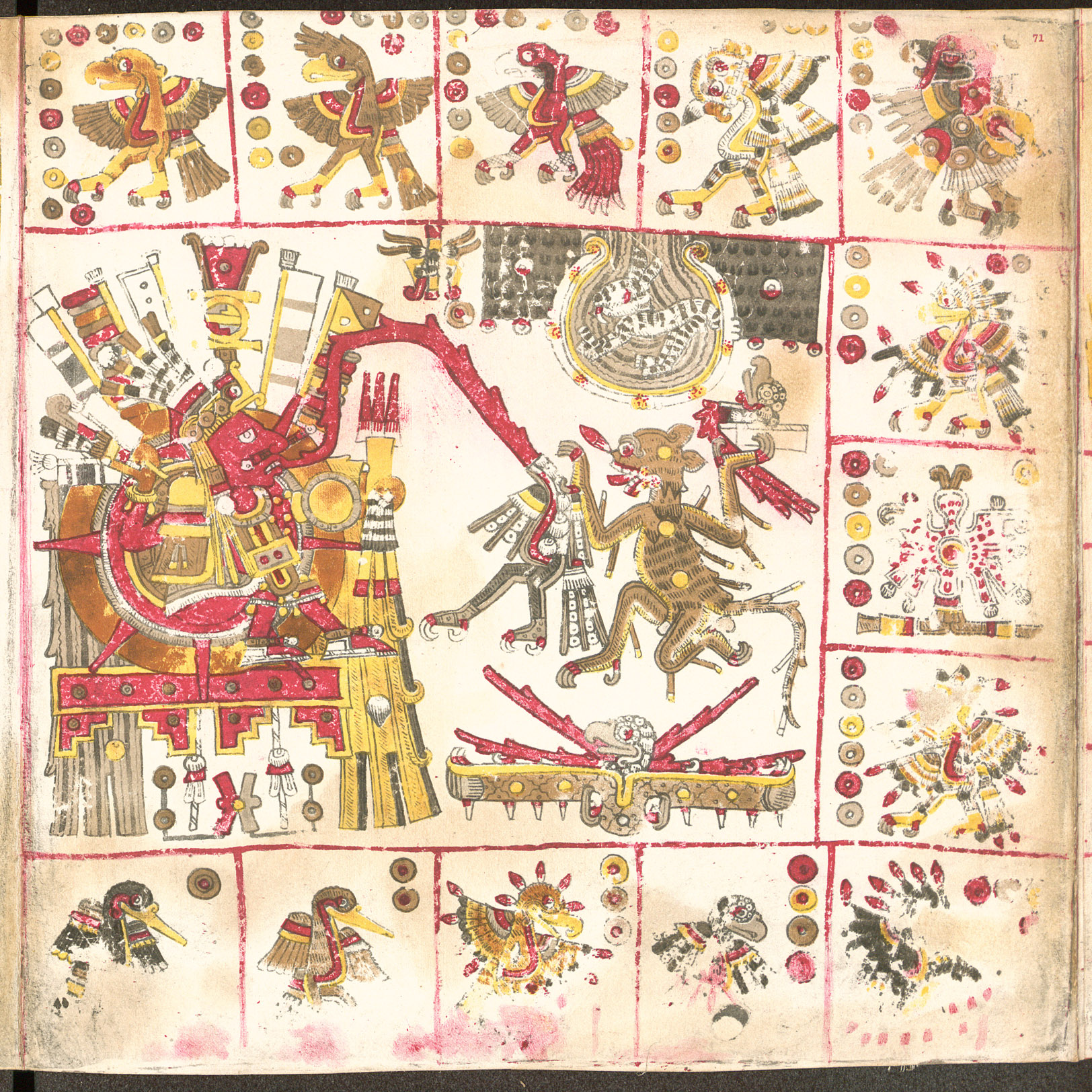
Page 71 of the Codex Borgia, depicts the sun god, Tonatiuh.

The Pre-Hispanic world had a rich tradition of writing and tlacuilolli (the art of painting codices) before Spanish colonization of the Americas when almost every native document was destroyed. The mere thirteen existing pre-Hispanic codices are now separated into three groups according to geographical region and subject matter. The Mixteca group originated from the Mixteca region of southwestern Mexico and contains predominantly myths, royal genealogies and history. The codices from this group include Codex Zouche-Nuttall; Codex Vindobonensis Mexicanus I; Codex Selden; Codex Bodley; and Codex Colombino. The Borgia group are believed to have been created in the Mixteca-Puebla region of central Mexico and they contain calendrical and ritual information. This group includes the Codex Borgia; Codex Cospi; Codex Laud; Codex Fejérváry-Mayer; and Codex Vaticanus B. Maya codices contained calendrical, astronomical and ritual information and are well known for being the source of today's understanding of Maya civilization. The surviving pre-Hispanic Maya codices include the Dresden Codex; Paris Codex; and Madrid Codex (Maya).

== Post-conquest and recovery ==
Almost all archives and codices of ancient Mesoamerica were destroyed as a result of conquest. Missionaries, physicians, and naturalists from Europe desired to understand and preserve aspects of native customs. Francisco Hernández de Toledo was sent to Mexico by the king of Spain in the 16th century to research medicinal properties of plants and native uses of plants. Friar Bernardino de Sahagún also made it his life's work to preserve the cultural heritage of the people of Tepepulco (present-day Hidalgo). Efforts such as these required them to learn native techniques to reproduce and preserve ancient knowledge in its traditional form. These preservation efforts were within a larger context of the assimilation of native people, and the documentation of native traditions by Europeans can be understood as a retelling through the lens of the conquerors. Much of what is known of Mesoamerican codex-making has been interpreted through these documents and reproductions. Preserving the last remaining codices means understanding how they were created; what materials and colorants were used; and what purposes they served. Recent efforts in codex preservation include non-invasive analysis; preventive conservation practices; digitization and reproductions.

== Non-invasive analysis ==
Non-invasive analysis through use of portable tools has been of vital importance to the conservation of Mesoamerican codices today. This is due to the delicate nature of the materials and pigments. “The multi-technique integrated approcach” of MOLAB in studying the Codex Cospi employed UV-vis absorption and emission to determine the sources of red colors on the pages. The reflectance spectra (absorbance maxima at 370,530 and 555 nm) indicated that there were features of “an anthraquinonic lake of animal origin”. The UV-vis reflection measurements were taken using a portable spectrophotometer. Portable devices ensure that the object is not over-handled. X-ray fluorescence (XFR), Infrared (IR) Spectroscopy, Raman spectroscopy, Ultraviolet-visible spectroscopy (UV-vis), Optical microscopy, and reference materials (historical documents and a preparation of Maya Blue) were all used in the analysis of Codex Cospi to determine the sources of the different colorants used. And this was done without having to remove samples from the codex.

The only invasive analysis carried out on the existing pre-Hispanic codices has been limited to small samples of the paper. In analyzing the Maya codices, analysis has confirmed the paper material as bark from “one or more species of the genus ficus" with a white layer of calcium carbonate. The only direct invasive analysis performed on the Madrid Codex consisted of an “examination of two bark paper samples” and was performed by Fudolf Schwede. Both non-invasive and previous destructive analysis has shown the use of carbon black was homogenous between Cospi, Codex Fejérváry-Mayer, Madrid Codex (Maya) and Codex Colombino. Recent technologies have enabled conservators and scientists to examine these documents without excessive handling or invasive sampling while much more has been discovered in regard to materials, colorants, and context.

=== X-ray fluorescence (XRF) ===
This method determines the chemistry of an object sample by measuring the fluorescent (or secondary) X-ray emitted from a sample when it is excited by a primary X-ray source.

=== Infrared (IR) spectroscopy ===
IR spectroscopy is used in determining and identifying the structural composition of an object. It measures absorption, emission and reflection of infrared light interacting with a molecule.

=== Raman spectroscopy ===
A technique used to detect molecular vibrations. Used in the chemical analysis and characterization of solids, liquids and gases.

=== UV-vis ===
Ultraviolet-visible (UV-vis) spectroscopy determines the concentration of analytes in a solution through light absorption or reflectance.

=== Optical microscopy ===
This method employs the use of an optical microscope to analyze a sample.

=== Digital microscopy ===
Digital microscopy employs a microscope that has a digital camera attached. This allows for images of a sample to be viewed and analyzed on an electric monitor display.

=== In situ analysis ===
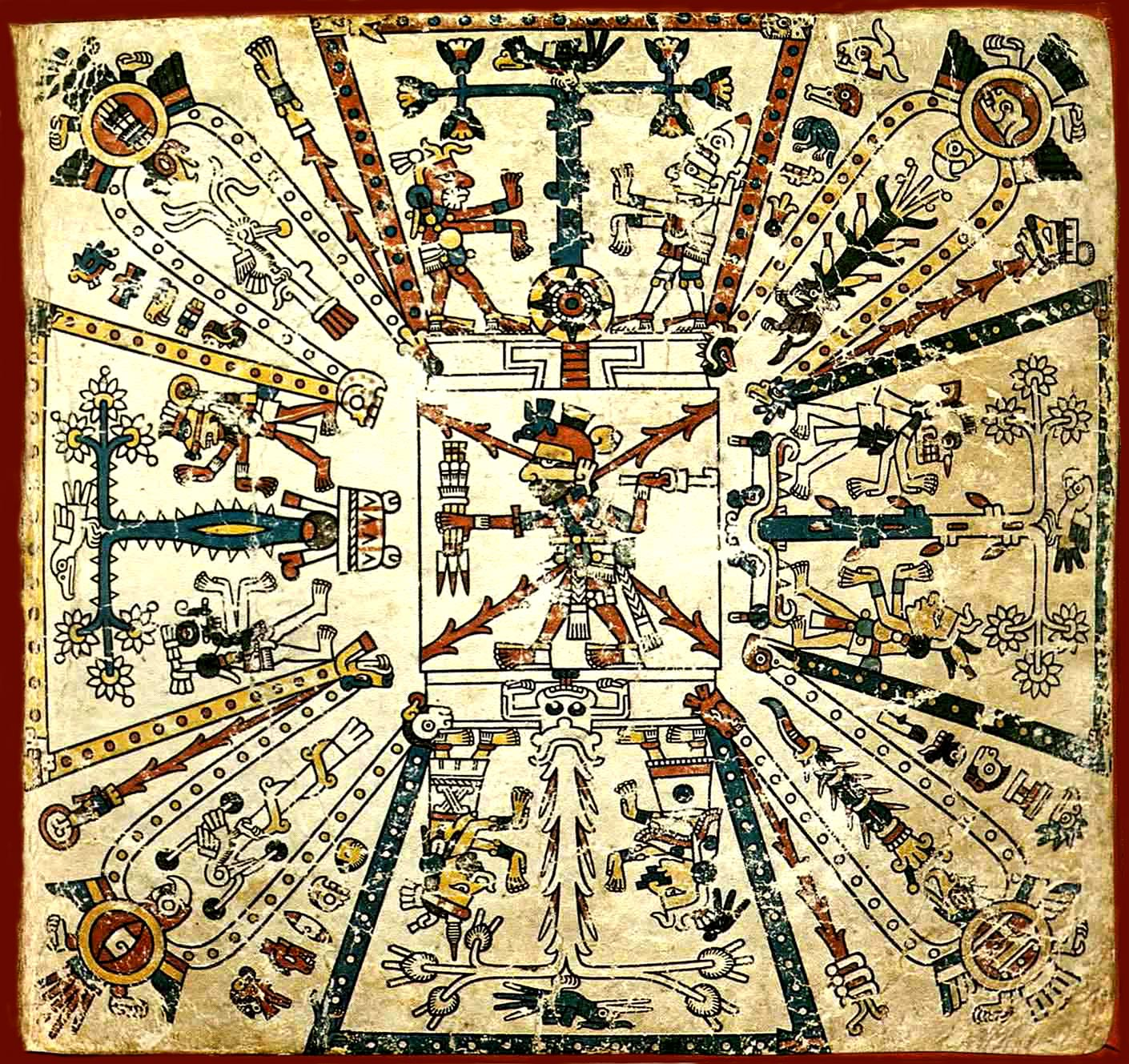
The first page of the Codex Fejérváry-Mayer

The existing pre-Hispanic codices have been examined in situ while employing different MOLAB techniques. These techniques include digital microscopy, Raman, UV-vis reflectance, and emission spectroscopy. To avoid stress, damage, and movement, supports were created by conservators to imitate the zigzag screenfold structure of the codices. In examining the fragment Cortesiano, part of the Madrid Codex, a specially designed support was created to hold the document vertically so that the images would be visible without having to handle them during analysis. The colorants, stylistic elements, and material components allow a better understanding of certain differences, as well as technical relationships between the codices, which contribute to the overall knowledge of the codex-making tradition in Mesoamerica.

Infrared spectroscopy allowed for analysis of the white layer covering on each side of the Codex Cospi and Codex Ferjérváry-Mayer to be identified as a composition of gypsum and calcium carbonate. The white layer on the Codex Ferjérváry-Mayer is “composed of a mixture of two different hydration forms of calcium sulfate: gypsum and anhydrite (anhydrous calcium sulfate)”. In all the codices that were analyzed, the white layer on the back and front of each codex were identical in composition which provides evidence that the white background was “prepared in a single moment, independently from the painting sessions”. Analysis between the codices have indicated “clear-cut division between the Borgia group and Mixtec codices,” which have gypsum-based paint covering an animal skin support, in contrast with the Maya codices which have a calcium carbonate-base covering a paper support.

== Preventive conservation and agents of deterioration ==
Preventive conservation is the process and practice of eliminating or slowing the effects of agents of deterioration. It requires constant assessment of environmental factors that put the collection at risk and must consider the effects of certain agents of deterioration on the various materials that make up the collection. The agents of deterioration that may put a collection at risk are physical forces; theft; fire; water; incorrect temperature; incorrect relative humidity (RH); pollutants; dissociation; pests; and light. This practice has become interdisciplinary and often requires a collective knowledge of science, “chemistry, physics, biology, engineering, systems science, and management” all while considering different value systems of different cultures.

=== Materials ===
The Borgia Group are composed of long strips of deer hide folded like an accordion and sized with white gesso. The covers consist of hide or wood attached to each end. The Maya codices, in contrast, are composed of a long strip of bark paper, or Amate, folded in the same accordion-like, screen-fold way as the Codex Borgia group. The most important codices were likely adorned with jaguar fur covers, although there is only documentational evidence of this.

In applying preventive conservation techniques to the preservation of Mesoamerican codices, the material composition of these objects put them at high risk. The colorants used on each of the codices are both organic and inorganic making the composite nature of these books difficult to preserve. The “detection of orpiment on the verso of Codex Cospi and on both sides of Codex fejérváry-Mayer” proved most unexpected as an inorganic pigment containing high amounts of arsenic trisulfide in the Raman spectrum. As some of the codices contain inorganic pigment, such as carbon black, they require attention to environmental pollutants that might react with or change the chemical structure (such as corrosion or dissolution of constituents). Along with the organic and inorganic pigments, gypsum and calcium carbonate were other compounds detected through analysis.

Organic materials such as bark paper, deer skin, and colorants are highly susceptible to deterioration from fluctuations in RH as well as incorrect RH. Furthermore, organic materials are hygroscopic (absorbing and emitting water). These materials attract mold, insects, rodents and other pests, and they are highly sensitive to light. The complex organic components of Mesoamerican codices, along with their fragility due to age, require a strictly controlled environment that limits exposure to light and maintains correct RH and temperature. “It takes time for objects made from hygroscopic materials to adjust to changes in RH”, which “can range between a few hours (such as a sheet of paper) to several weeks (such as a wooden sculpture)”. Although short-term fluctuations may be tolerated, damage can result in situations where the extreme change in temperature or RH remains long enough for the object to respond.

Through assessing all the possible risks, conservators develop strategies that aim to balance these risks with the appropriate risk management strategies. Digitization and sharing of information are of utmost importance for improving the field of Conservation-restoration. A push toward digitization and digital records management will also work to prevent risks of dissociation.

== Treatment of Post-Hispanic codices ==
In the periods after conquest, there is evidence of a fusion of Spanish and Native influence that became common in manuscript making. Post-Hispanic codices contain a mixture of both Native and European styles and materials. Treatments have been conducted on Mesoamerican codices to prevent further decomposition and to assist in preservation. In current treatment of such codices, it is sometimes necessary to reverse old treatments for further preservation. Although, in the field of Conservation-Restoration it is recognized that no treatments are fully reversible. In the more recent treatment of the Huexotzinco Codex, or Huejotzingo codex, the decision to unbind the pages, clean and treat them was agreed upon after careful consideration.

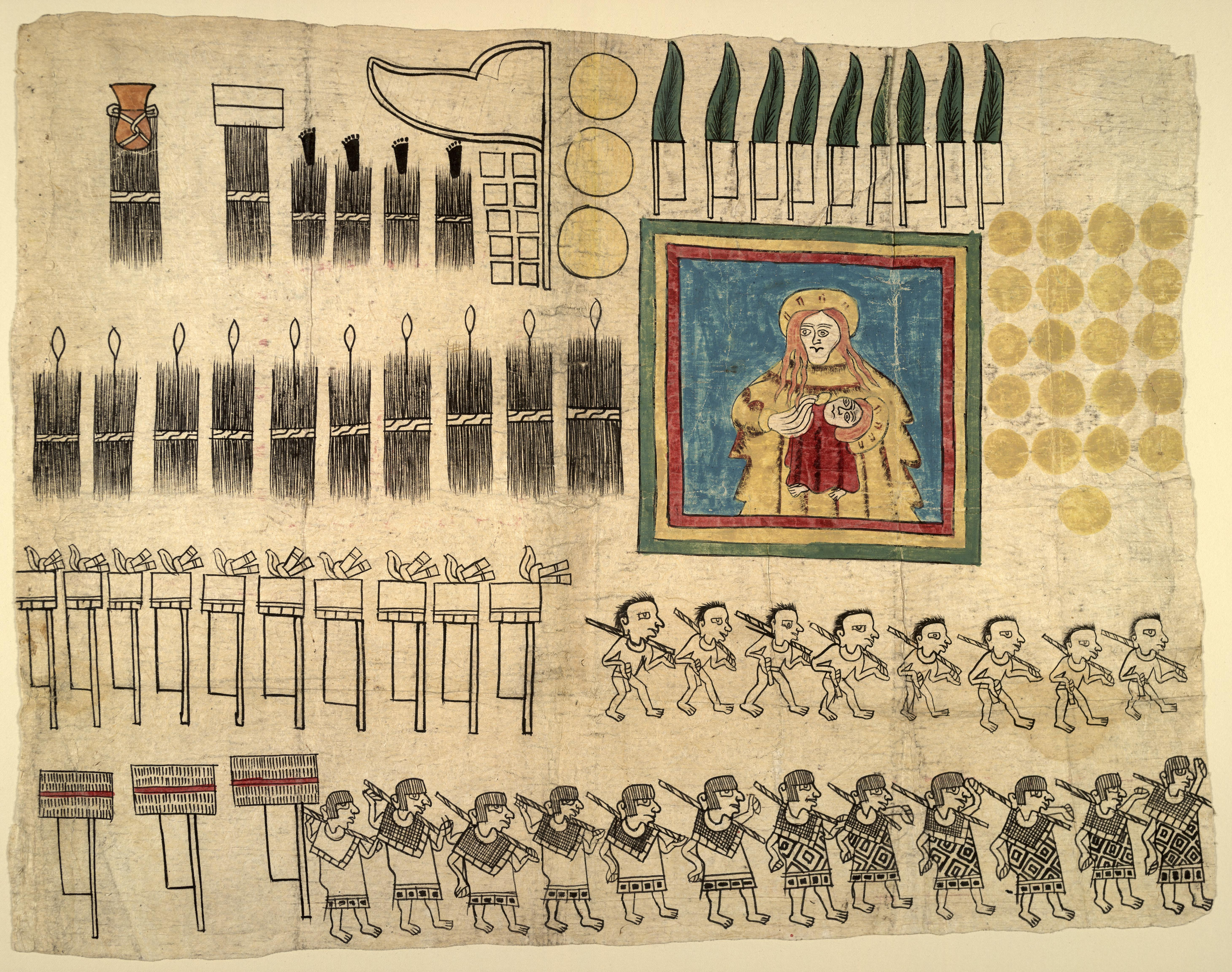
Panel 1 of the Huexotzinco Codex; the panel contains an image of the Virgin and Child and symbolic representations of tribute paid to the administrators

=== Documentation ===
The condition both before and after treatment is to be thoroughly documented. Documentation often includes images for reference. A treatment proposal is prepared, revised, approved and documented as is the entire treatment process.

=== Handling ===
The delicate leaves of the codex are placed in polyester film sleeves during analysis and treatment to protect them during handling.

=== Cleaning ===
The leaves, or pages, of the codices can first be dry-cleaned with grated Staedtler Mars plastic eraser crumbs as used in the treatment of Codex Huejotzingo. Tests are conducted to determine how the ink and leaves will react to aqueous treatment. The risks of aqueous treatment on Mesoamerican codices include the ink seeping further into the pages and stresses from expansion and contraction. Nonaqueous treatments are preferable for Mesoamerican codices. A solution of methyl magnesium carbonate was used in cleaning the Codex Huetjotzingo in which the leaves are submersed to give them an alkaline reserve. Tetrahydrofuran (THF) is used to remove adhesives and staining caused by adhesives from the leaves prior to treatment with methyl magnesium carbonate.

=== Treating tears and areas of loss ===
Mending with Japanese papers is a preferred method of repairing areas of loss. A micrometer is used to determine and match the thickness of the leaves. Matching the thickness of the leaves is important for preventing new stresses when the pages are put back together.

=== Treating ink-damaged leaves ===
Heat-set tissue toned with acrylic pigments is a preferred material due to flexibility, strength, and reversibility. This method also proved beneficial for attaining the appropriate tone of color.

=== Treating silked pages ===
Silking is a treatment method in which large areas of loss are filled with laid paper with a layer of Crépeline (a French close-weave transparent silk) applied over it. The process of silking causes the ink to blur over time and sink through to the opposite sides of the pages. To treat the silked pages of the Huejotzingo Codex, an aqueous solution was needed to remove the silking. "An alpha amylase enzyme solution was selected to detach the silk from the paper without transfer of ink"

== Digitization, reproductions, and access ==
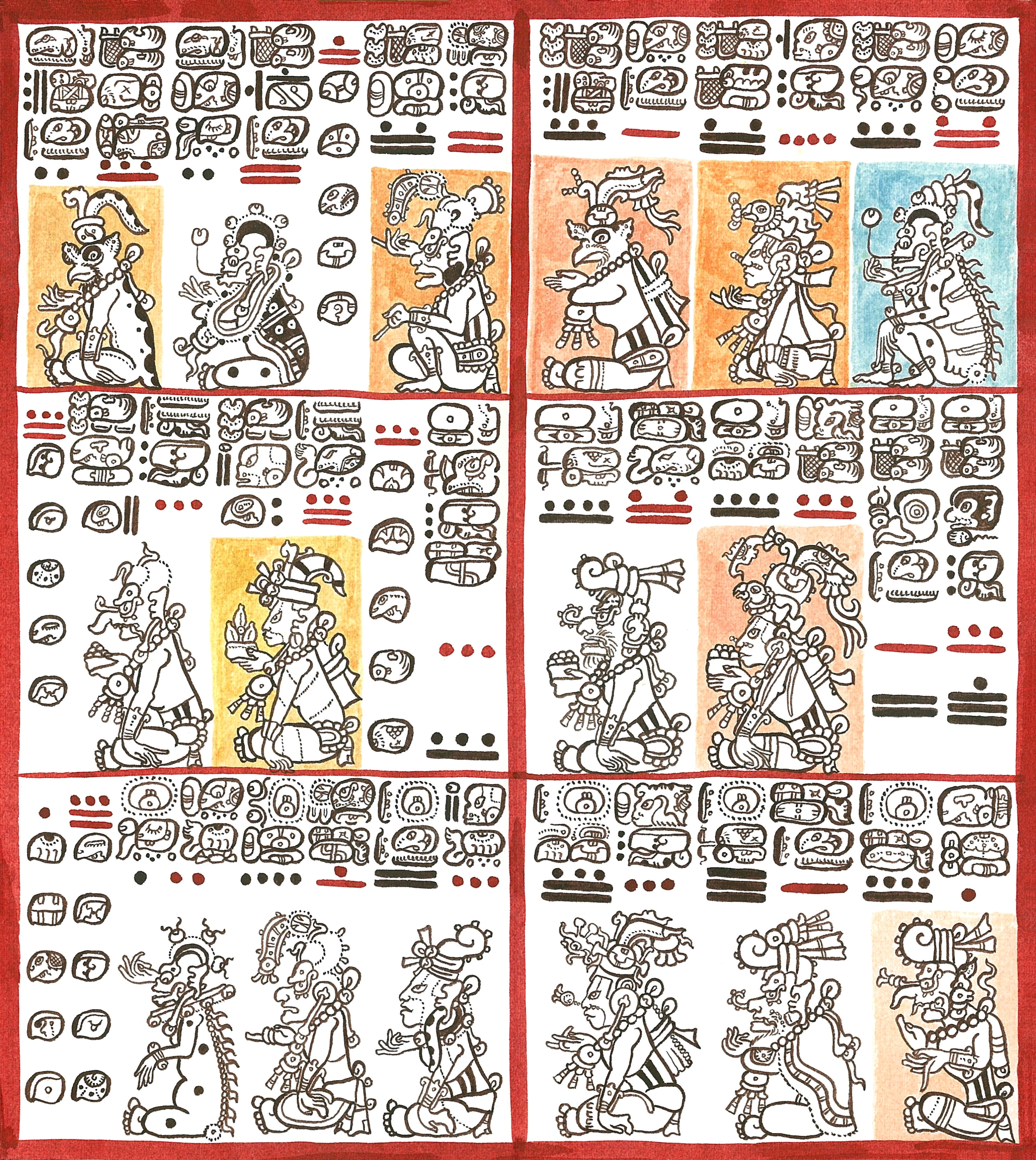
plates 10 and 11 of the Dresden Maya Codex. Drawing by Lacambalam, 2001

Concerning the surviving pre-Hispanic codices, digitization serves to contribute to new research findings and continued linguistic studies of ancient Mesoamerican civilizations. Research can be more easily conducted without having to travel around the world to view the codices in person. Allowing physical contact with the codices for research purposes contributes to risks of light exposure; physical risks of handling; environmental risks; and even possible theft. Facsimiles have been produced and published on Mesomerican codices in efforts to preserve their contents and to make them accessible. They are used by researchers and students to contribute to the knowledge of the pre-Hispanic Mesoamerican world as well as historical evidence of the impact of Spanish conquest.

== Historical evidence of pre-Hispanic codex making ==
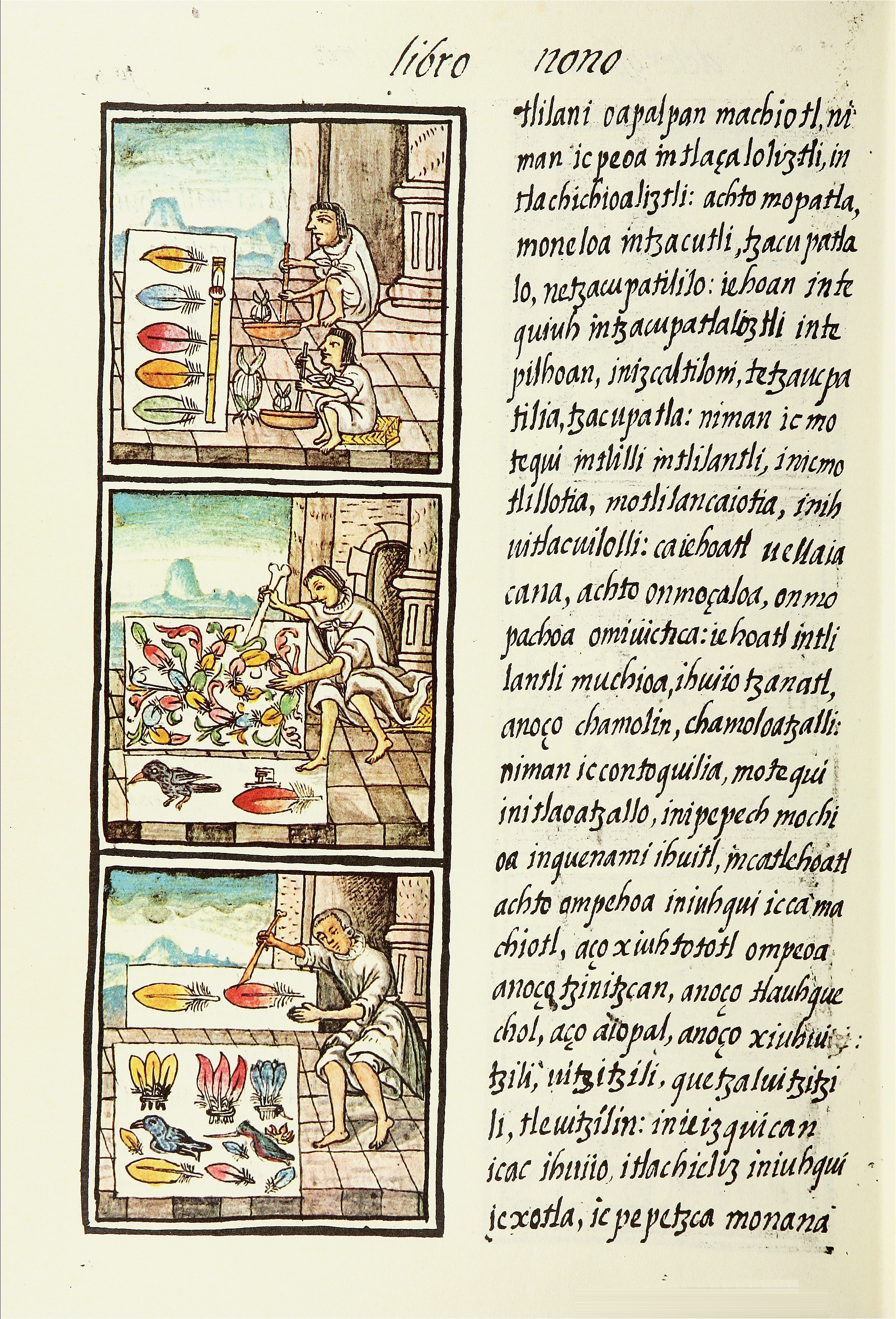
Aztec feather artisans or painters. Florentine Codex (ca. 1576) with native drawings and Nahuatl text

Bernardino de Sahagún recorded names and characteristics of plants and colors used by painters and documented his research in the Florentine Codex. The Florentine Codex is a primary resource for understanding the creation and uses of codices, as well as for understanding the politics of post-conquest Mexico. The use of gypsum, tzacuhtli (organic glue extracted from orchids), nacazcólotle (dark red obtained from the wood of Caesalpinia coriaria), have all been described in the writings of Sahagún and others. Francisco Hernández recalls that tézhuatl (yellow-red extracted from Miconia laevigata) “was commonly mixed with cochineal and alum in order to obtain” the color. This mixture is “similar to the one detected on Codex” Cospi. Descriptions from the early years of conquest describe not only the materials and uses of codices, but also the reasoning and process of their destruction.

The "fields of Maya epigraphy and religious iconography were born through the pioneering efforts of Ernst Förstemann, Eduard Seler, and Paul Schellhas," through early studies of the Dresden Codex. The Madrid Codex (Maya) is especially important to researchers in that it was likely in use from the second half of the 15th century through the first decade of the 17th century, and it contains a paper patch with Latin and Spanish text. This codex is a “compilation of information” drawn from across space and time as various portions are the “result of the conversion in a Maya format of central Mexican almanacs such as those found in” codices from the Borgia group. This suggests that scribes had direct access to the Borgia Codex or other related manuscripts. The “intrusion of European stylistic elements," “over time, would become more prominent in tlacuilolli, to the point of eclipsing the ancient native traditions”
