= Mesoamerican codices =

Manuscript that presents traits of the Mesoamerican indigenous pictoric tradition

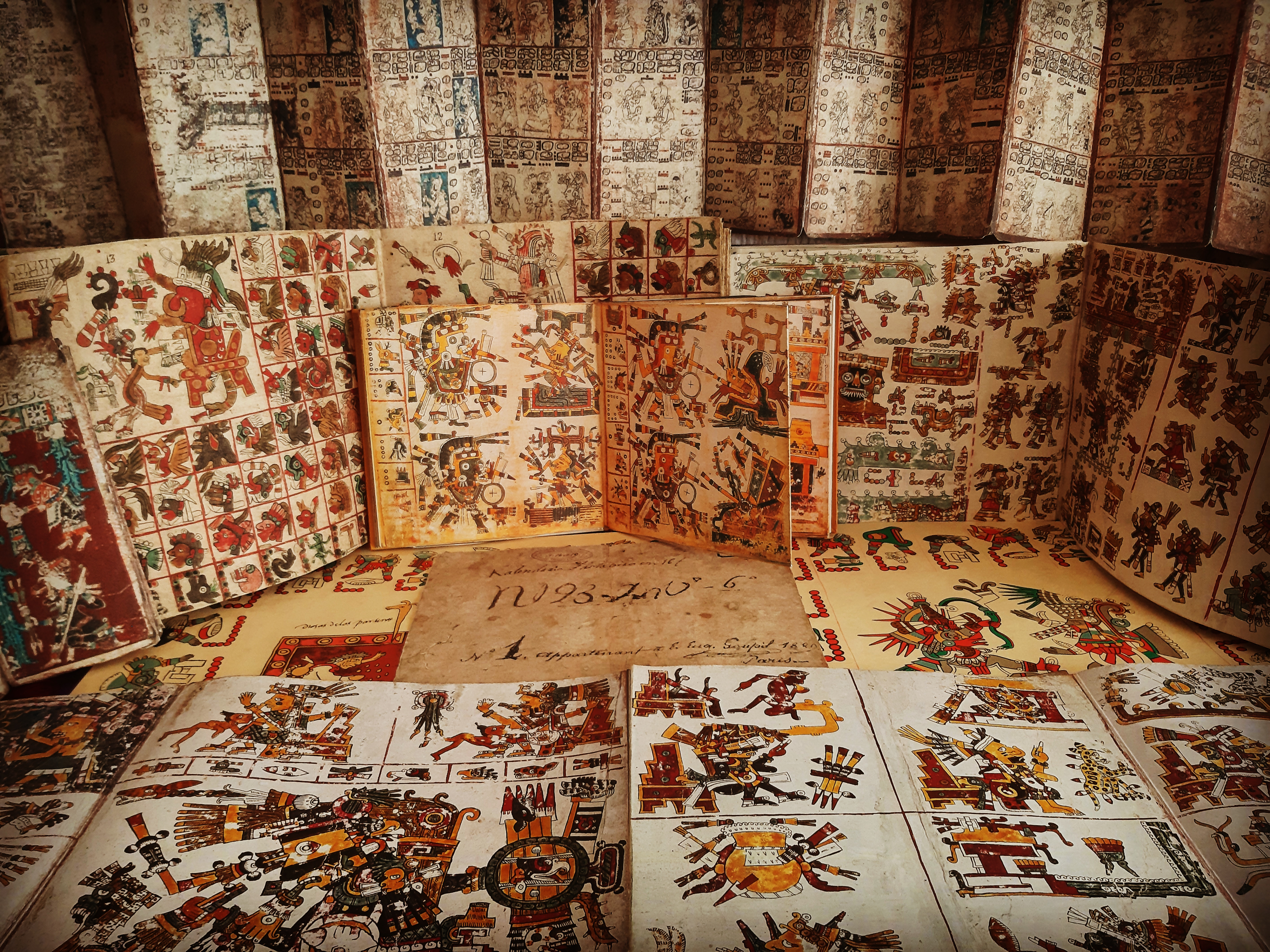
Some examples of facsimile versions of Mesoamerican codices

Mesoamerican codices are manuscripts that present traits of the Mesoamerican indigenous pictoric tradition, either in content, style, or in regards to their symbolic conventions. The unambiguous presence of Mesoamerican writing systems in some of these documents is also an important, but not defining, characteristic, for Mesoamerican codices can comprise pure pictorials, native cartographies with no traces of glyphs on them, or colonial alphabetic texts with indigenous illustrations. Perhaps the best-known examples among such documents are Aztec codices, Maya codices, and Mixtec codices, but other cultures such as the Tlaxcaltec, the Purépecha, the Otomi, the Zapotecs, and the Cuicatecs, are creators of equally relevant manuscripts. The destruction of Mesoamerican civilizations resulted in only about twenty known pre-Columbian codices surviving to modern times.

== Formats ==
During the 19th century, the word 'codex' became popular to designate any pictorial manuscript in the Mesoamerican tradition. In reality, pre-Columbian manuscripts are, strictly speaking, not codices, since the strict librarian usage of the word denotes manuscript books made of vellum, papyrus and other materials besides paper, that have been sewn on one side. Instead, precolumbian pictorials were made in native, non-codical formats, some of these being the following:

- Tira A manuscript painted or drawn on a long and more or less narrow strip composed of sheets of animal hide or paper. This is the most important format, for many of the rest derive of it. A well known example is the Codex Boturini.
- Screenfold A tira folded into a folding book manuscript. A classic example is the Codex Borgia.
- Roll A tira that has been rolled. An example is the Selden Roll.
- Lienzo A sheet of cloth, sometimes of grand format. The Lienzo de Quauhquechollan is a notable example.
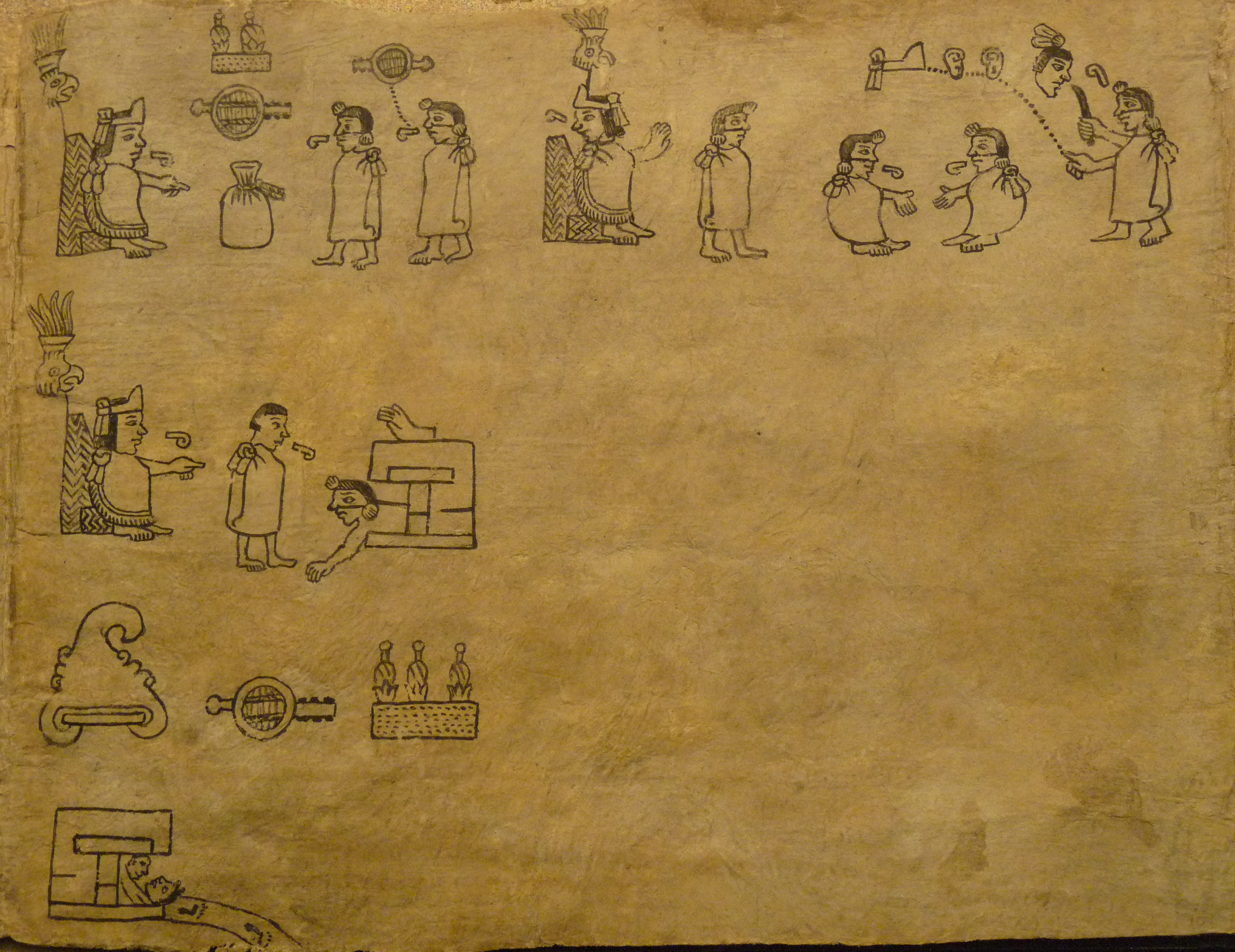
Boturini Codex, an example of a tira

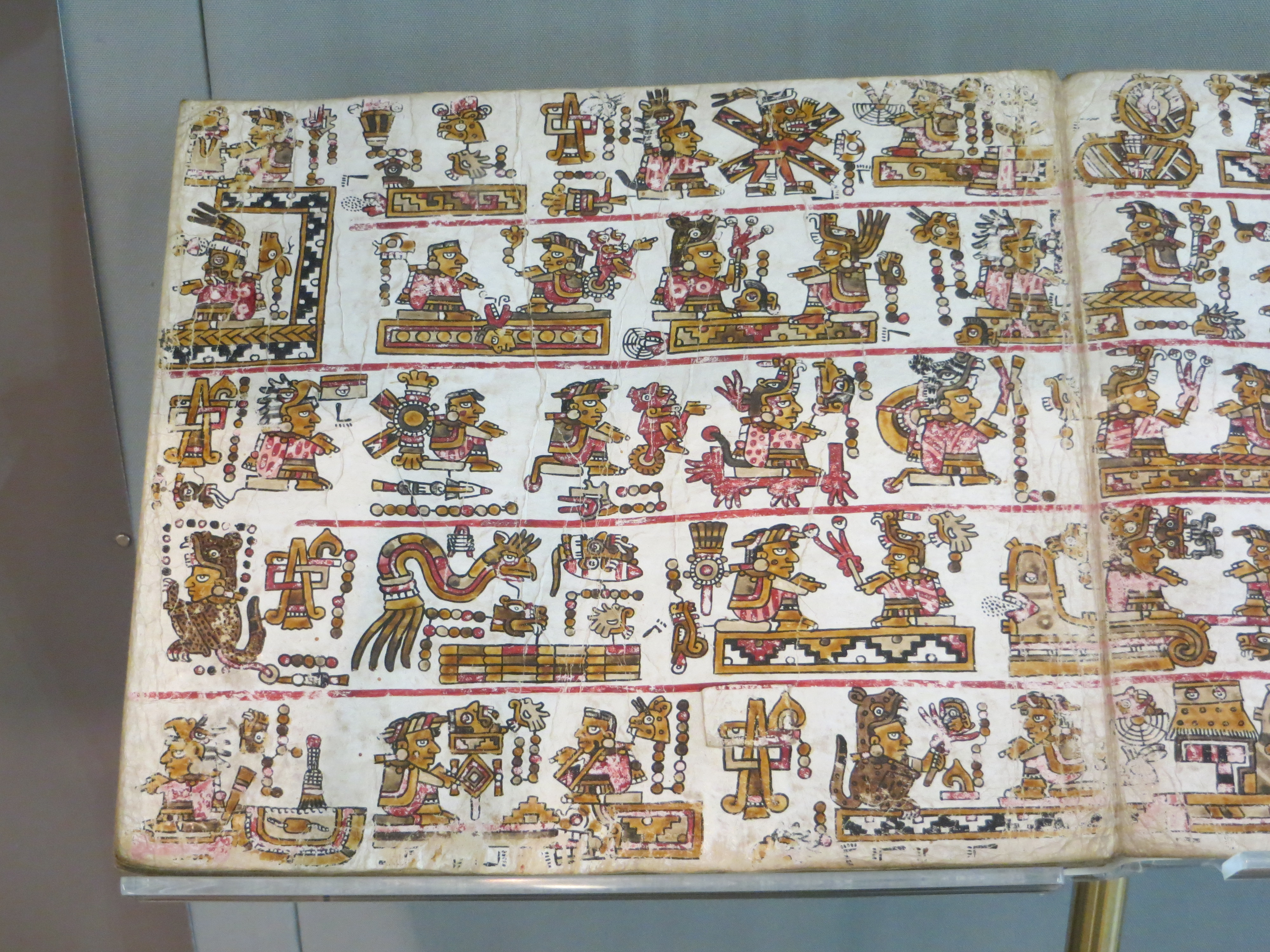
Codex Bodley is a screenfold

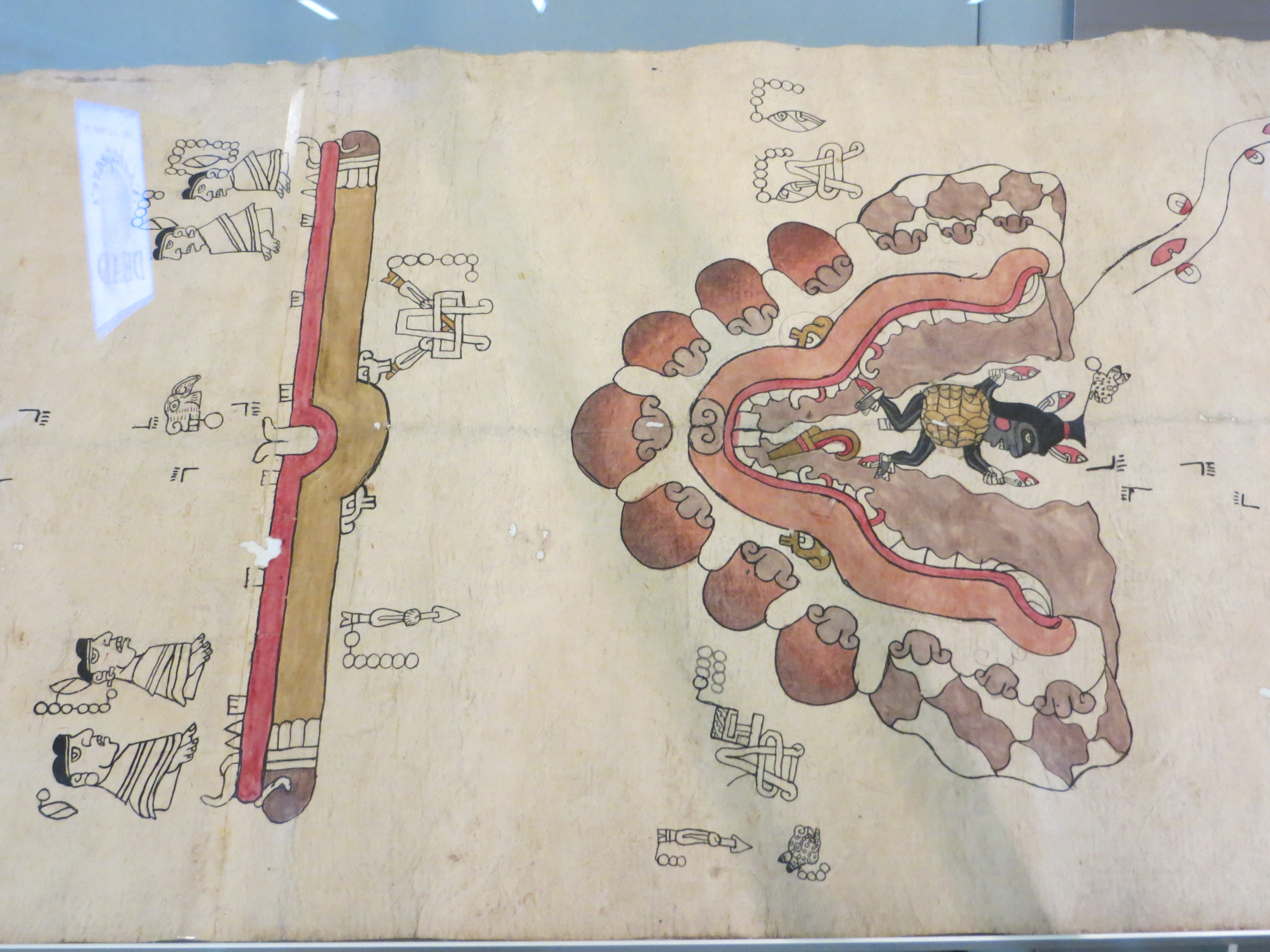
The Selden Roll, a tira that has been rolled rather than folded

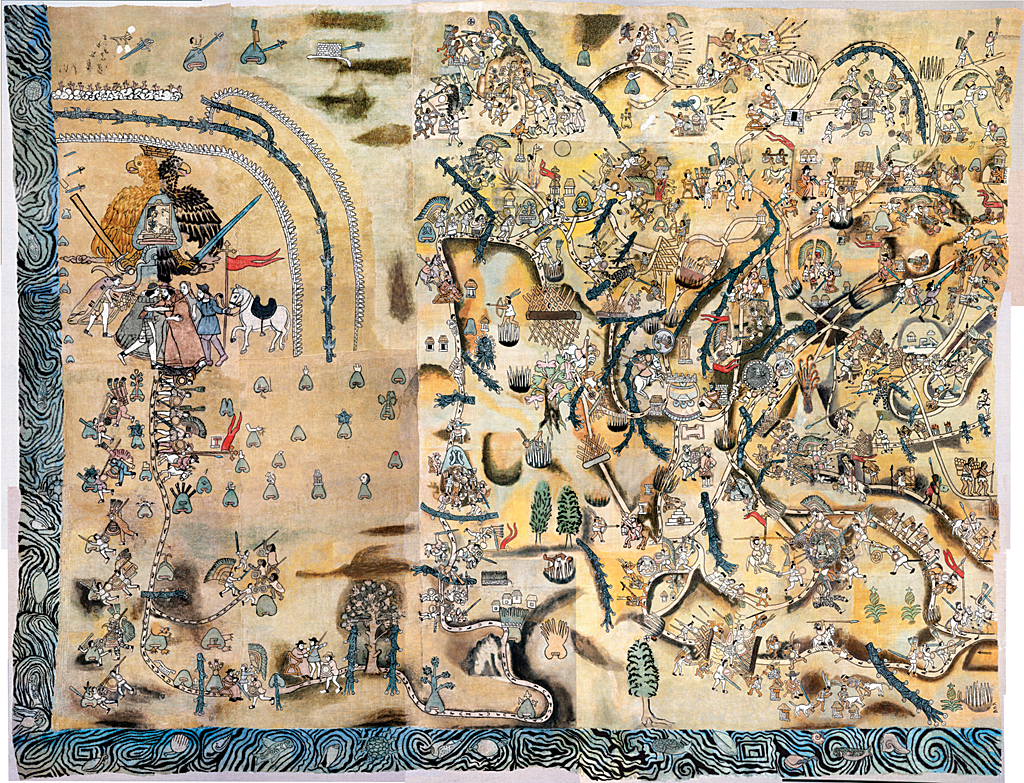
The Lienzo de Quauhquechollan, a cloth of large format

== Classification ==
According to Donald Robertson and John B. Glass, the first scholars to propose a comprehensive census of such documents, five categories can be discerned among them. The first is that of traditional pictorials (which we will name "traditional codexes" in this article), comprising numbers 1-599 in their catalog. The second is that of paintings and maps from the Relaciones Geográficas, a set of questionnaires elaborated by the colonial bureaucracy of the Spanish Empire during the reign of Phillip II (numbers 601-699). The third category is that of Techialoyan manuscripts, a number of late colonial manuscripts created during the 17th century with the intention to serve as legal documents for indigenous communities, which display a noticeable similarity in style and format, as well as sharing a regional origin (numbers 701-799). The fourth category is that of pictorial cathecisms, also known as Testerian cathecisms (numbers 801-899). The fifth category is that of falsified pictorials. Finally, the category of nonpictorial texts which describe pictorials is contemplated, but not used, by Robertson and Glass (numbers 1000 and up), but examples of such documents exist too.

Besides this primary classification, these documents can be further classified according to their origin, their region, and subject, Thus, in regards to their origin, manuscripts can be distinguished as pre-Columbian (like those of the Borgia group), those produced under Spanish patronage (the Codex Mendoza being a notable example), native colonial (for example, Codex Xolotl), and mixed colonial (like the Lienzo de Tlaxcala). In regards to their topic, these documents can be classified as dealing with the following topics: ritual-calendrical, historical, genealogical, cartographic, cartographic-historical, economic, ethnographic, and miscellaneous.

These manuscripts can comprise many regions: Western Mexico (mainly Michoacan), Central Mexico (Mexico City and the State of Mexico, Guerrero, Hidalgo, Morelos, Puebla, Tlaxcala and Veracruz), Oaxaca, Southeast Mexico (Chiapas and Yucatan) and Guatemala. Regional schools have been identified: the classic division in the Central Mexican region was proposed by Donald Robertson, who distinguished among them the schools of Tenochtitlan, Tlatelolco and Tezcoco.

=== Traditional Mesoamerican codices ===
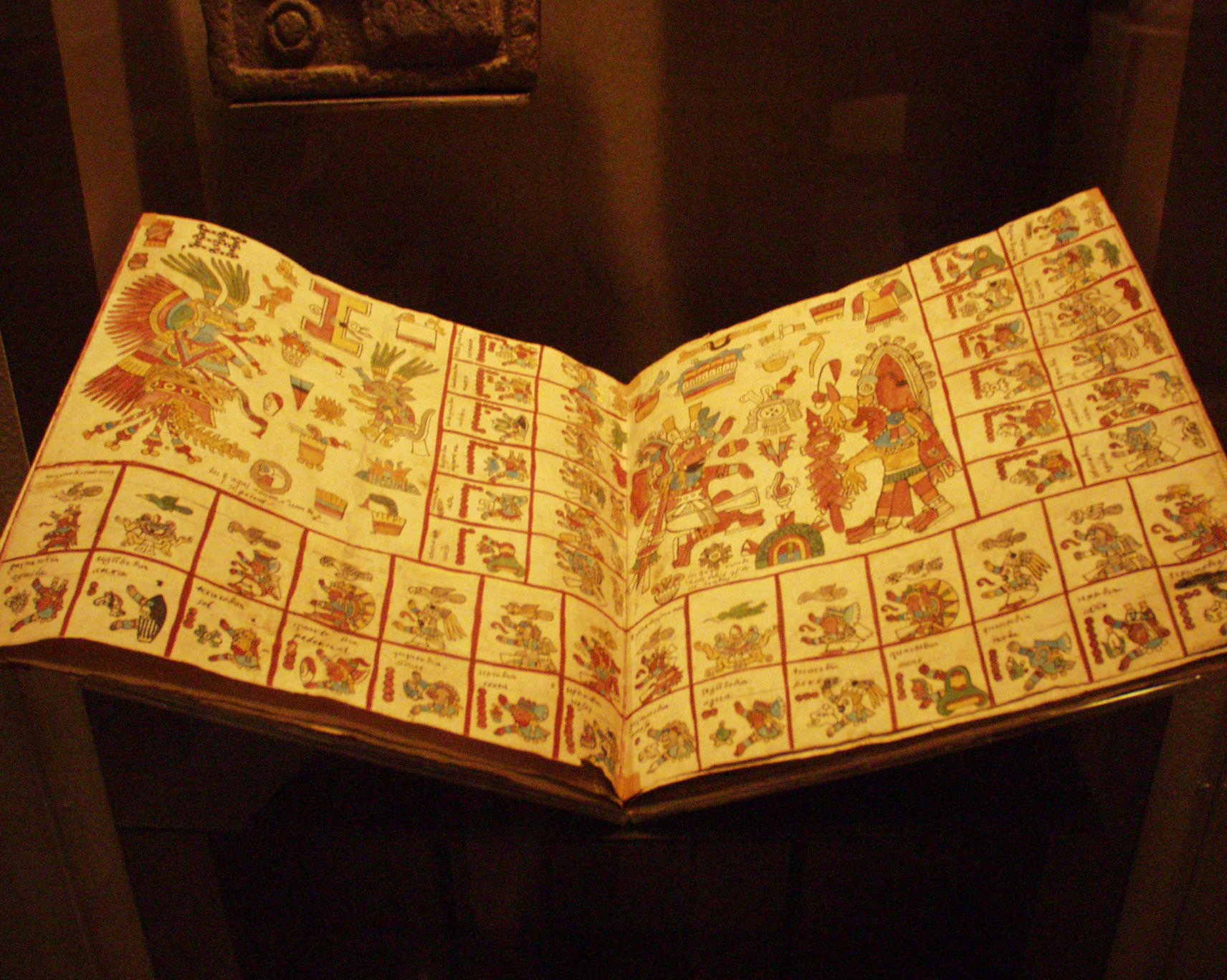
Codex Borbonicus, a traditional Mesoamerican codex

This category comprises most pre-Columbian and colonial Mesoamerican pictorials, and is by far the best-known and studied. Individual manuscripts in this category are numerous, totalling 434 in Robertson and Glass original census, and their number keeps increasing thanks to the discovery of new native traditional codices in Mexican villages. An example of a recent addition would be the Codex Cuaxicala, a pictorial document from the 16th century currently kept by the homonymous community of Huachinango, Puebla. A list of the most representative manuscripts from this category would be the following:

- Pre-Hispanic codices: Aubin Tonalamatl, Codex Borbonicus, Codex Borgia, Codex Cospi, Codex Féjérvari-Mayer, Codex Laud and Codex Vaticanus B, the Aubin Manuscript no. 20, Codex Bodley, Codex Colombino, Codex Nutall, Codex Vindobonensis Mexicanus I, Codex Dresden, Codex Madrid, the Paris Codex, and the Maya Codex of Mexico.
- Native codices produced under Spanish patronage: Duran Codex, Ramírez Codex, the illustrations of Sahagun's Primeros Memoriales and the Florentine Codex, Codex Ríos, Codex Telleriano Remensis, Codex Ixtlilxochitl, Codex Tudela, Codex Magliabechiano, Codex Mendoza, the Matrícula de Tributos, Codex Badianus, Relación de Michoacan.
- Native colonial codices: From the Valley of Mexico: Codex Aubin, Codex Azcatitlan, Boban Calendar Wheel, Codex Boturini, Códice en Cruz, Plano en papel de maguey, Codex Mexicanus, Mapa Quinatzin, Mapa Sigüenza, Tira de Tepechpan, Mapa Tloztin, Codex Xolotl. From Central Mexico: Codices of Azoyu 1 and 2, Maps of Cuauhtinchan 1-3, Codex Huamantla, Codex Huichapan, Humboldt fragment 1, Historia Tolteca Chichimeca, Anales de Tula. From Northern and Western Oaxaca: Lienzo Antonio de León, Codex Becker no. 2, Lienzo de Coixtlahuaca no. 1 and 2, Códice Fernández Leal, Lienzo de Santiago Ilhuitlan, Lienzo de Santa María Nativitas, Codex Porfirio Díaz, Selden Roll, Lienzo de Zacatepec no. 1.
- Mixed native colonial codices: Records of colonial history: Lienzo de Cuauhquechollan, Codex of Tlatelolco, Lienzo de Tlaxcala; Genealogical: Confirmation des elections de Calpan, Circular genealogy of Nezahualcoyotl, Genealogía de los Príncipes mexicanos, Genealogie de Tlatzantzin, Genealogía de Zolin; Maps and cartographic-historical documents: Lienzo de Chalchihuitzin Vásquez, Mapa de Coatlinchan, Mapa circular de Cuauhquechollan, Codex Kinsborough, Lienzo de Misantla, Mapa de San Antonio Tepetlan. Economic and land records: Códice de Santa María Asunción, Códice Chavero, Codex Cozcatzin, Matrícula de Huejotzingo, Humboldt fragments, Codex Kinsborough, Códice Mariano Jiménez, Códice Osuna, Oztoticpac Lands Map, Libro de Tributos de San Pablo Teocaltitlan, Census of Tepoztlan, Mapa catastral de Tepoztlan, Códice de Tlamapa no. 3, Codex Vergara, Plans of Xochimilco, Codex Santa Anita Zacatlalmanco.
- Contemporary codexes: This category, not contemplated by Robertson and Glass, comprises all new indigenous pictorials made with traditional techniques and with indigenous contents, such as the contemporary Otomí Alfonso García Téllez Manuscripts.

Within these categories, some sub-groupings of codices that are closely related in subject or that share a common prototype exist. Among the most famous are the following:

- Borgia group: This well-known group comprises Codex Borgia, Codex Cospi, Codex Féjérvari-Mayer, Codex Laud and Codex Vaticanus B,
- Huitzilopochtli group: This grouping establishes the relationship between Codex Telleriano Remensis and Rios.
- Lienzo de Tlaxcala group: This group comprises all versions of the pictorial account of the Spanish Conquest in the point of view of the Tlaxcaltec, collectively known as the Lienzo de Tlaxcala. It is composed by three originals, all unknown nowadays, and 11 copies, many incomplete.
- Maya screenfolds: The Dresden Codex, Codex Madrid, Codex Paris and the Maya Codex of Mexico
- Magliabechiano group: This group has been studied in depth by José Batalla Rosado. Pictorials belonging to it are the Codex Tudela, Libro de Figuras, Códice Ritos y Costumbres (lost), Codex Magliabechiano, Codex Ixtlilxochitl I, Codex Veytia and some images from the Décadas of Antonio de Herrera. Non pictorial accounts in this group include: Códice Fiestas, Códice Cabezón and the Chronicle of New Spain of Salazar.
- Nutall group: Codex Colombino, Codex Bodley, Codex Nuttall, Codex Selden anc Codex Vindobonensis Mexicanus I.
- Sahagun drawings: Primeros Memoriales and Florentine Codex.

=== Paintings from the Relaciones Geográficas ===
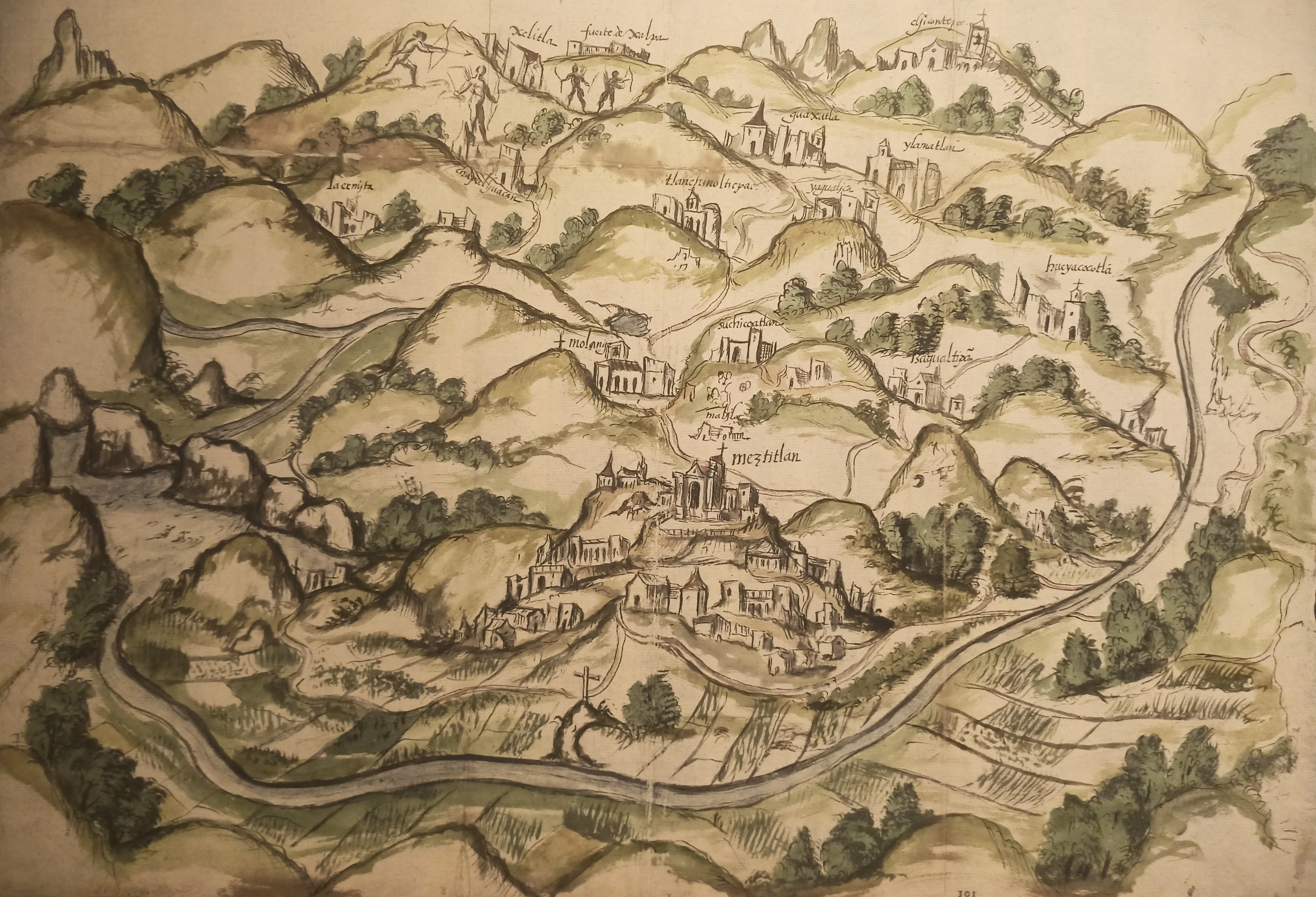
Map of Metztitlan, from the Relación Geográfica de Metztitlán (1579)

This group comprises all the paintings and illustrations from the Relaciones Geográficas, a series of documents produced as a result of questionnaires distributed to the territories under the jurisdiction of Phillip the Second, King of Spain, during the years 1579–1585. Besides their invaluable ethnohistorical, ethnological and geographical data, the Relaciones often includes a series of paintings and maps, some considered to display elements of the native cartographical tradition.

=== Techialoyan manuscripts ===
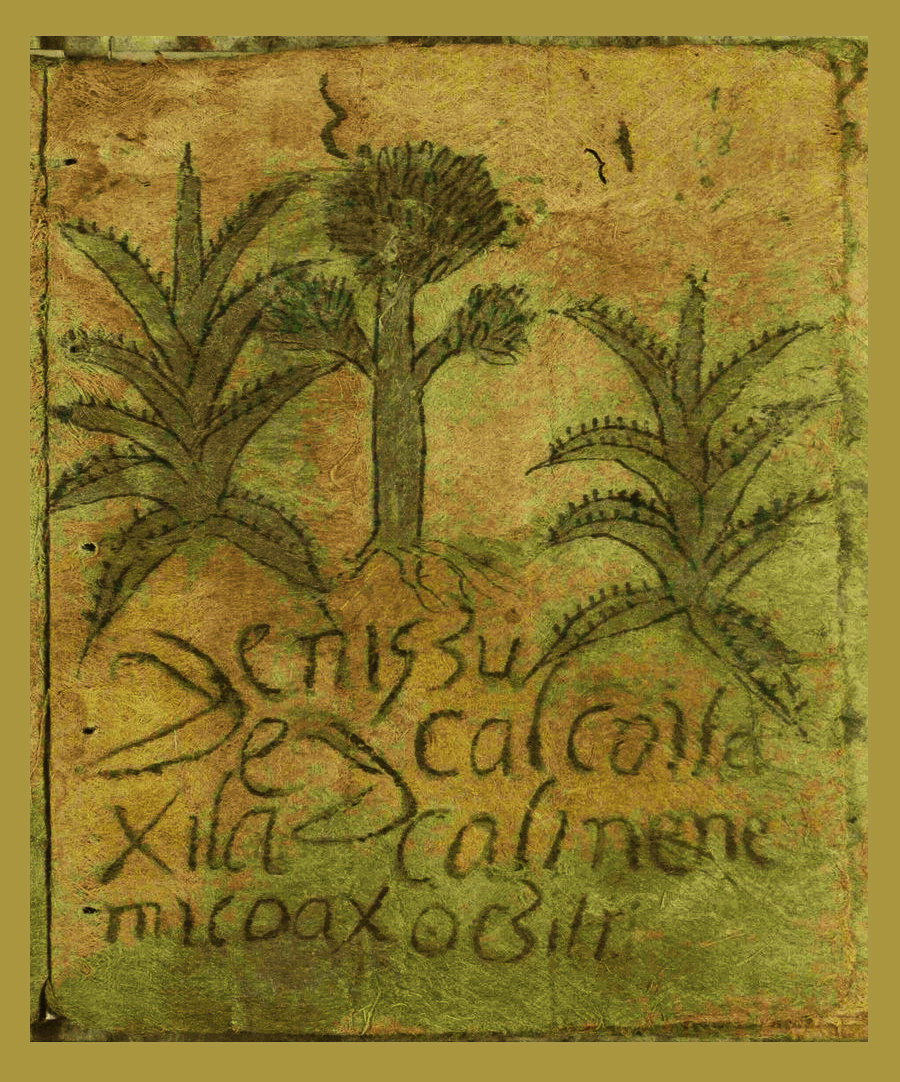
The Techialoyan Codex of Cuajimalpa, an example of a Techialoyan manuscript

The Techialoyan manuscripts is a group of indigenous Mexican manuscripts named after the Codex of San Antonio Techialoyan. These documents were produced during the 18th century, and reveal a set of common elements, including the use of amate paper, the presence of Nahuatl alphabetic glosses, their artistic style, their legal purpose and the fact that they were created in a number of villages in and around the State and the valley of Mexico. They were first classified by Robert Barlow. Some of them were produced by local indigenous artists in order to be recognized as legal documents for the colonial Spanish administration, but were deemed as forgeries. A foremost example of this class is the Codex García Granados.

=== Pictorial cathecisms ===
Pictorial cathecisms, also known as Testerian manuscripts, are documents containing prayers, articles of faith, or any part of the Catholic cathecism, either drawn or written through mnemonic images or ad-hoc hieroglyphs. They are called "Testerian" because they were once taught to be an invention of the Franciscan friar Jacobo de Testera; however, most documents of this tradition are unrelated to Testera, who was not even the first friar to use them. For this reason, some scholars consider them as being an indigenous rather than a Spanish creation. Therefore, the use of the term has been avoided in recent academic works. Regardless, pictorial cathecisms form a clear group, characterized by the use of a new iconographic and a hieroglyphic repertoire unrelated to that of Mesoamerican cultures. Due to the fragmented and dispersed state of the manuscripts, many of which are still not even individually named yet, the study of this group is still incipient. Relevant works include those of Galarza, Anne Whited Normann, and Hill-Boone.

=== Falsified codices ===
This category comprises forgeries created during the 19th and 20th centuries in order to deceive institutions and individual collectors regarding their authenticity. They vary noticeably in their contents, materials and techniques. Some are purely fantastical, while other combine disparate native styles and sources. Materials vary from native amate paper, to agave fibers, parchments, cloth, animals skins and even coconut fiber. Notable examples in this category are the Codex Moguntiacus, the Codex of Lieberec and the Codex Hall. Finally, some recently surfaced documents, like the Codex Cardona, are still waiting to be confirmed as either forgeries, Techialoyan documents or actual traditional pictorials.

=== Non-pictorial codices ===
Non pictorial manuscripts describing lost indigenous pictorials are rare; this category was contemplated, but not used, by Glass and Robertson originally, but in recent years such documents have emerged. One such example is the Códice Cabezón, a textual copy of Codex Tudela that was never illustrated, and the Codex Fiestas, a copy of the lost pictorial Libro de Figuras, although the former contains some sketches of illustrations that were never completed.

== Pictography and writing ==
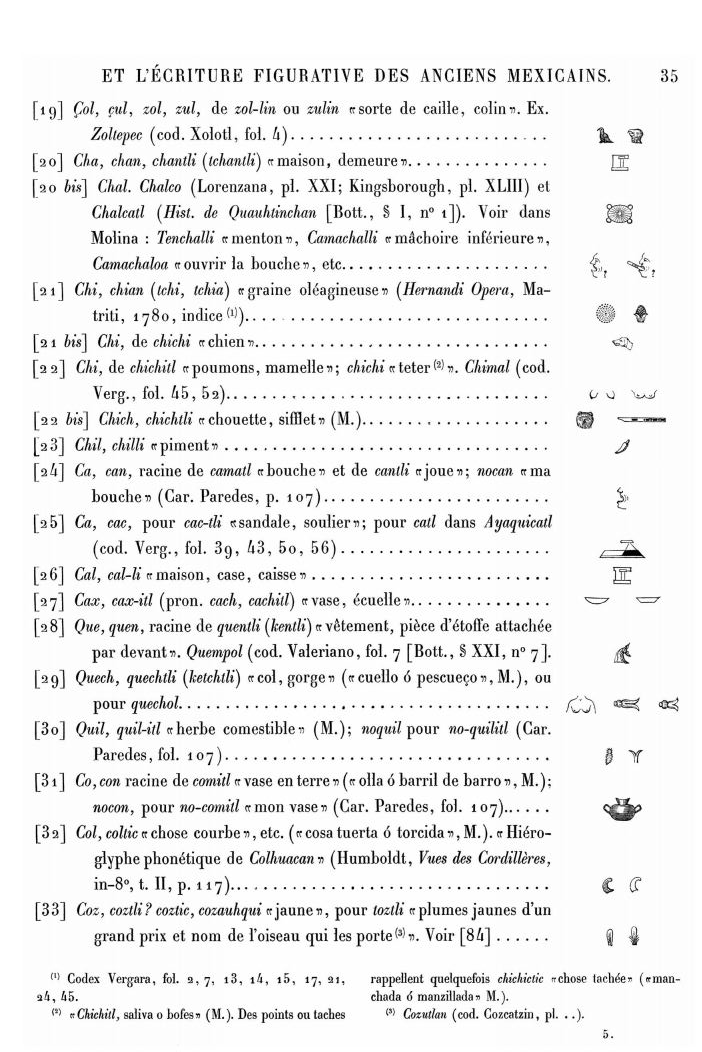
List of Aztec writing signs in the work of J. A. Aubin (1885).

Much controversy has been dedicated to the relationship between pictures and writing in these documents. While the polemic has been settled regarding the Maya, whose writing system is recognized nowadays as being logo-syllabic, the relationship between image and writing in non-Maya Mesoamerican manuscripts, which comprise a vast majority of these documents, has not reached an academic consensus as of yet. Current specialists are divided between grammatological perspectives, which consider these documents as a mixture of iconography and writing proper, and semasiographical perspectives, which consider them a system of graphic communication which admits "glottography", or a limited representation of language. In regards to linguistic affiliation, the problem is increased by the fact that some of the foremost among these documents are for now impossible to assign to any particular language due to the lack of any noticeable phoneticism in them (like Codex Borgia), while some others seems to illustrate Spanish rather than native accounts (like Codex Magliabechiano), or are a mixture of Spanish and native alphabetic glosses with native hieroglyphic writing (like the Codex Mendoza). Thus, the classification of these documents by Glass and Robertson was originally agnostic on the polemic of pictography and hieroglyphic writing, as well as on the linguistic affiliation of these documents.

== Conservation and restoration ==
Conservation and restoration of Mesoamerican codices is the process of analyzing, preserving, and treating codices for future study and access. It is a decision-making process that aims to establish the best possible methods and tools of preservation and treatment. The conservation-restoration of Mesoamerican literature is essential for understanding the ancient civilizations of Mexico. Efforts of restoration have proved difficult due to their fragility and importance of preserving historical and evidential value. Non-invasive technologies have been a more recent advancement, making analysis and treatment of pre-Hispanic codices a delayed process. As analysis continues, digitization has also been a more recent and valuable means of making information accessible to a wider audience, thus contributing to further research and preservation.
