= Codex B =

Codex B may refer to various ancient documents:

- Codex Vaticanus, also known as "Codex Vaticanus B", an early Greek copy of the Bible
- Codex B, the first version of the Samaritan Pentateuch to become known in the west
- Codex Vaticanus B, a pictorial Mexican manuscript in the Vatican Library
