= Codex Cospi =

Pre-Columbian Mesoamerican pictorial manuscript

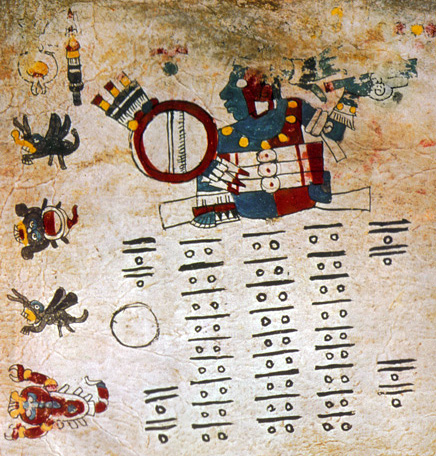
A page from the codex

The Codex Cospi (or Codex Bologna) is a pre-Columbian Mesoamerican pictorial manuscript, included in the Borgia Group. It is currently located in the library of the University of Bologna.

Like other manuscripts in the Codex Borgia, the Codex Cospi is believed to derive from the Puebla-Tlaxcala region but the exact origin of the manuscript is unknown. The contents of the manuscript are of a religious and divinatory character including depictions of the Venus god, Tlahuizcalpanteuhtli, and of Gods, or priests dressed as gods, present offerings in front of temples. The back side pictorially describes rituals that involve counted bundles in front of deities. The rituals are intended for obtaining good luck and protection in several activities. Similar scenes are found in the codices Fejérváry-Mayer and Laud. Eduard Seler remarked, the depictions in the Codex Cospi resemble those in "comic books" : this may characterize the political situation (regarded as farcical and comical) wherein Tlaxcallan, although completely encircled by the Aztec empire, was deliberately not incorporated into it in order to exemplify the magnanimity of the Aztec rulers.

The Codex Cospi has many close specific resemblances in content to Codex Borgia, most notably both codices' beginning with a sequence of 104 scenes (Cospi, pp. 1–8 = Borgia, pp. 1–8). Another resemblance is the Codex Cospi god having "two knives as a head": this is equivalent to double-knife-headed god central to Codex Borgia, p. 32.
