= Codex Porfirio Díaz =

Colonial Mesoamerican pictorial manuscript

The Codex Porfirio Díaz or Códice de Tututepetongo is a colonial Mesoamerican pictorial manuscript, consisting of a 10-page vellum screenfold. It is sometimes included in the Borgia Group.

== Bibliography ==
- Doesburg, Bas van (2001). "The Codex Porfirio Díaz and the Map of Tutepetongo: The Curious Relationship between Pictography and Glosses in Oaxacan Screenfolds". Ethnohistory. 48 (3): 403–432. doi:10.1215/00141801-48-3-403.
- Hunt, Eva (1978). "The Provenience and Contents of the Porfirio Diaz and Fernandez Leal Codices: Some New Data and Analysis". American Antiquity. 43 (4). American Antiquity, Vol. 43, No. 4: 673–690. doi:10.2307/279498. JSTOR 279498.
