= Selden Roll =

16th-century Mexican pictorial manuscript roll

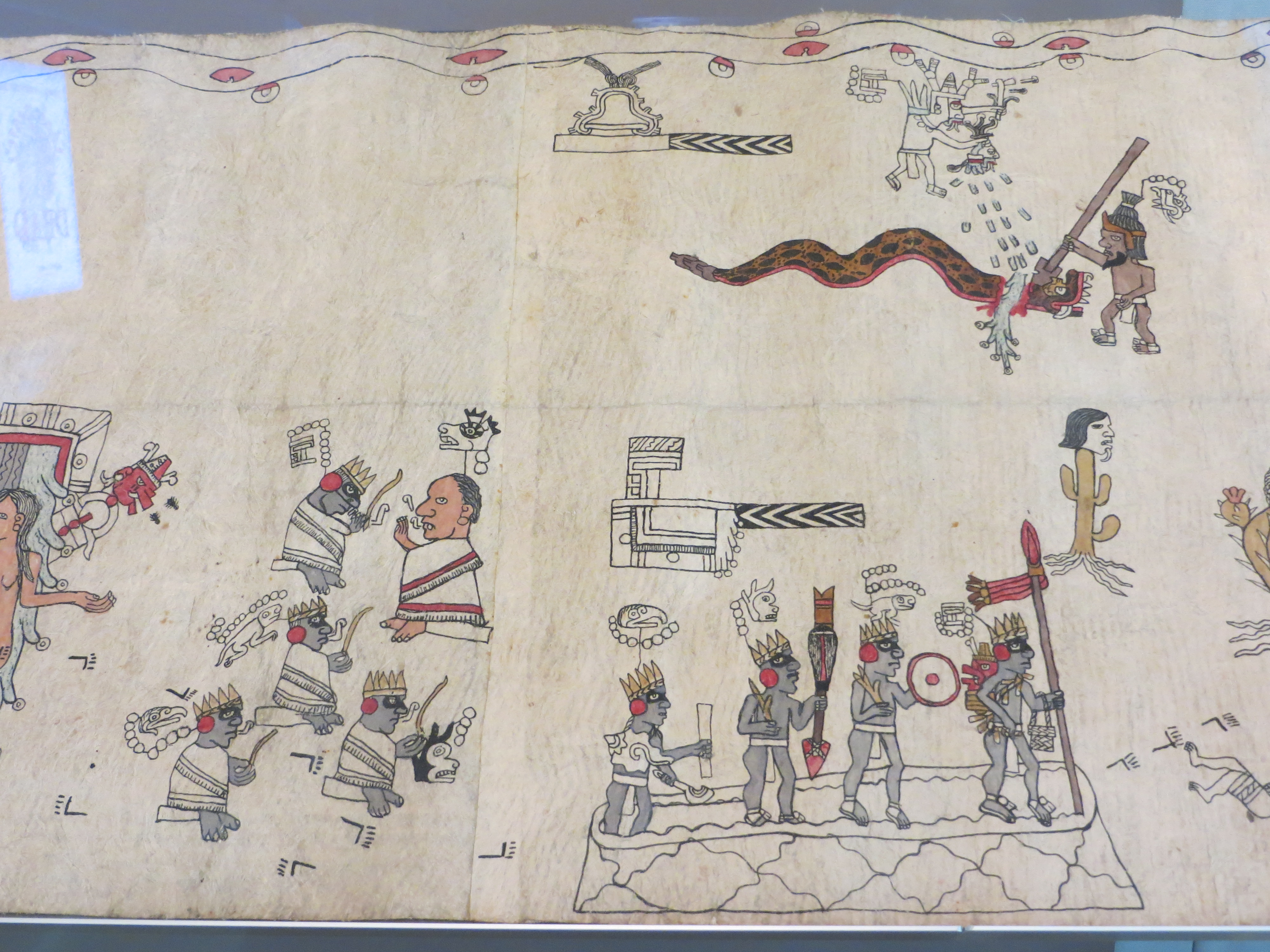
The Selden Roll on display at the Bodleian Library in Oxford

The Selden Roll is a 16th-century Mexican manuscript painted roll from the Coixtlahuaca region, incorporating both Mixtec and Aztec elements, probably recording myths of the origin and migration of divine ancestors.

The Selden Roll belonged to the English jurist John Selden, who died in 1654 and left his collection of books and manuscripts to the University of Oxford. It is held at the Bodleian Library (shelfmark MS. Arch. Selden. A. 72 (3)).

The roll was shown in a small public exhibition at the Bodleian Library in 2015 entitled "The Roll of the New Fire (Selden Roll): Painting from Early Colonial Mexico".

The Bodleian Library holds four other Mesoamerican codices: Codex Bodley, Codex Laud, Codex Mendoza, and Codex Selden.

== Gallery ==
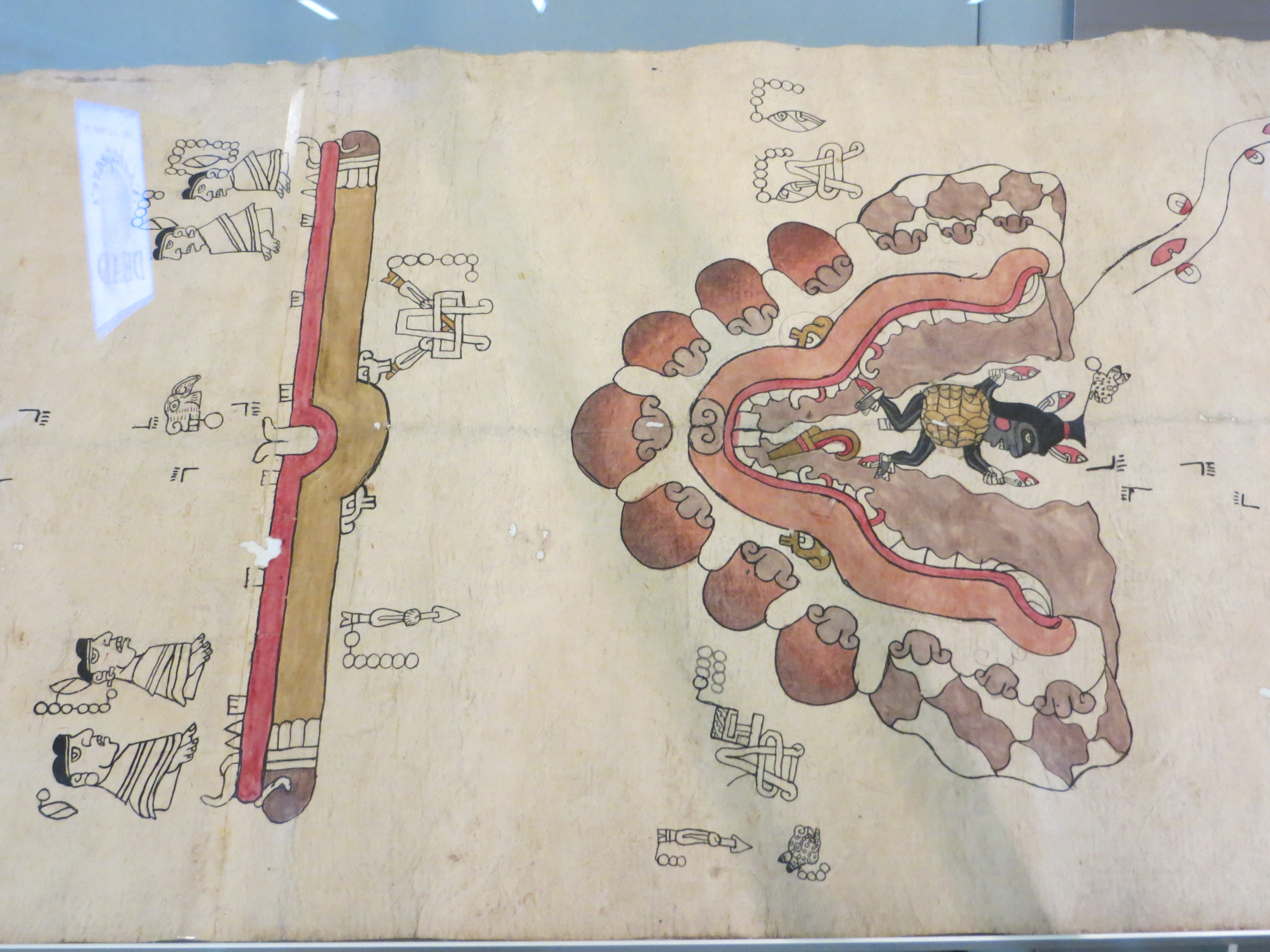
Other views of the Seldon Roll on display at the Bodelian Library

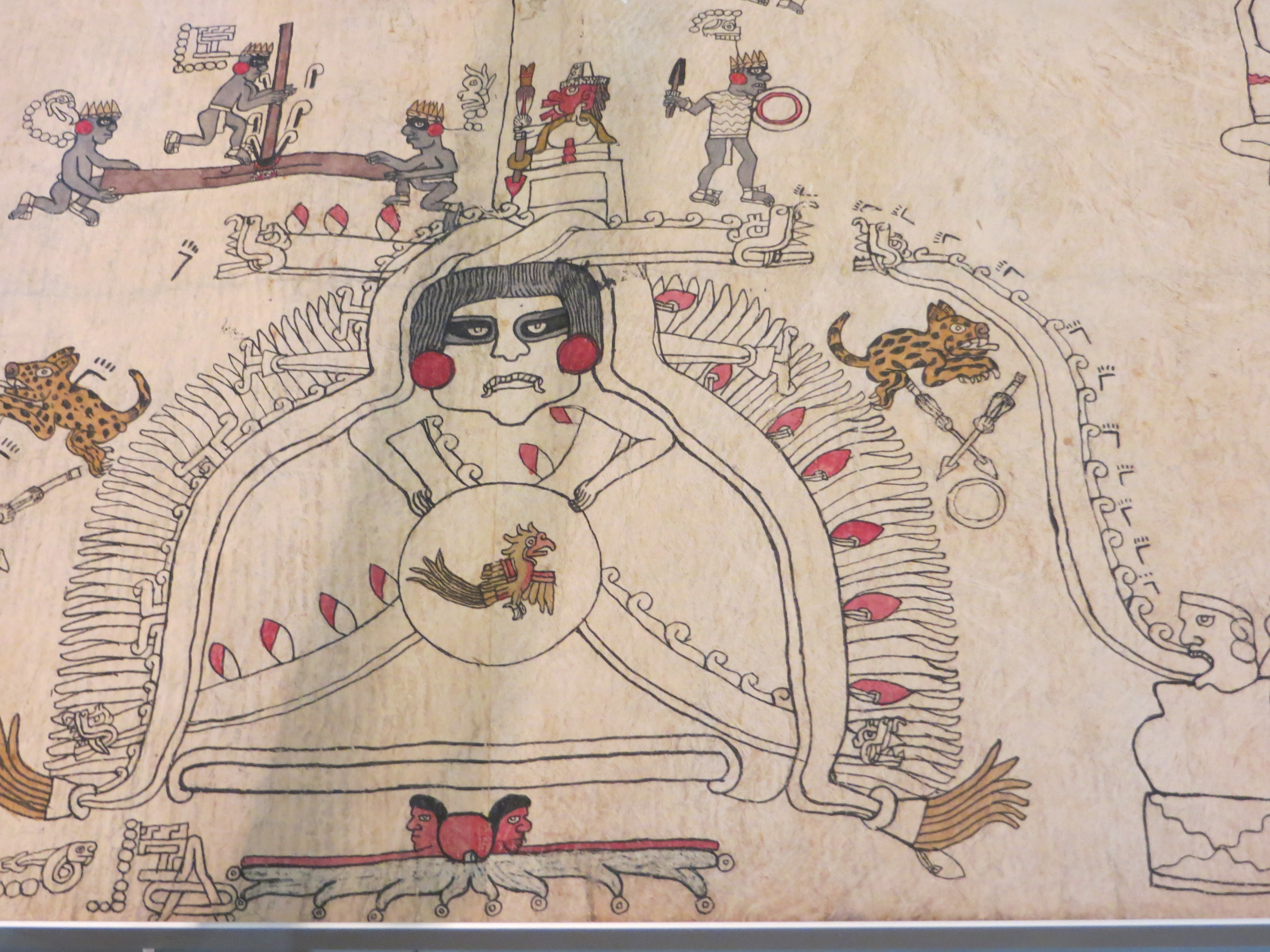

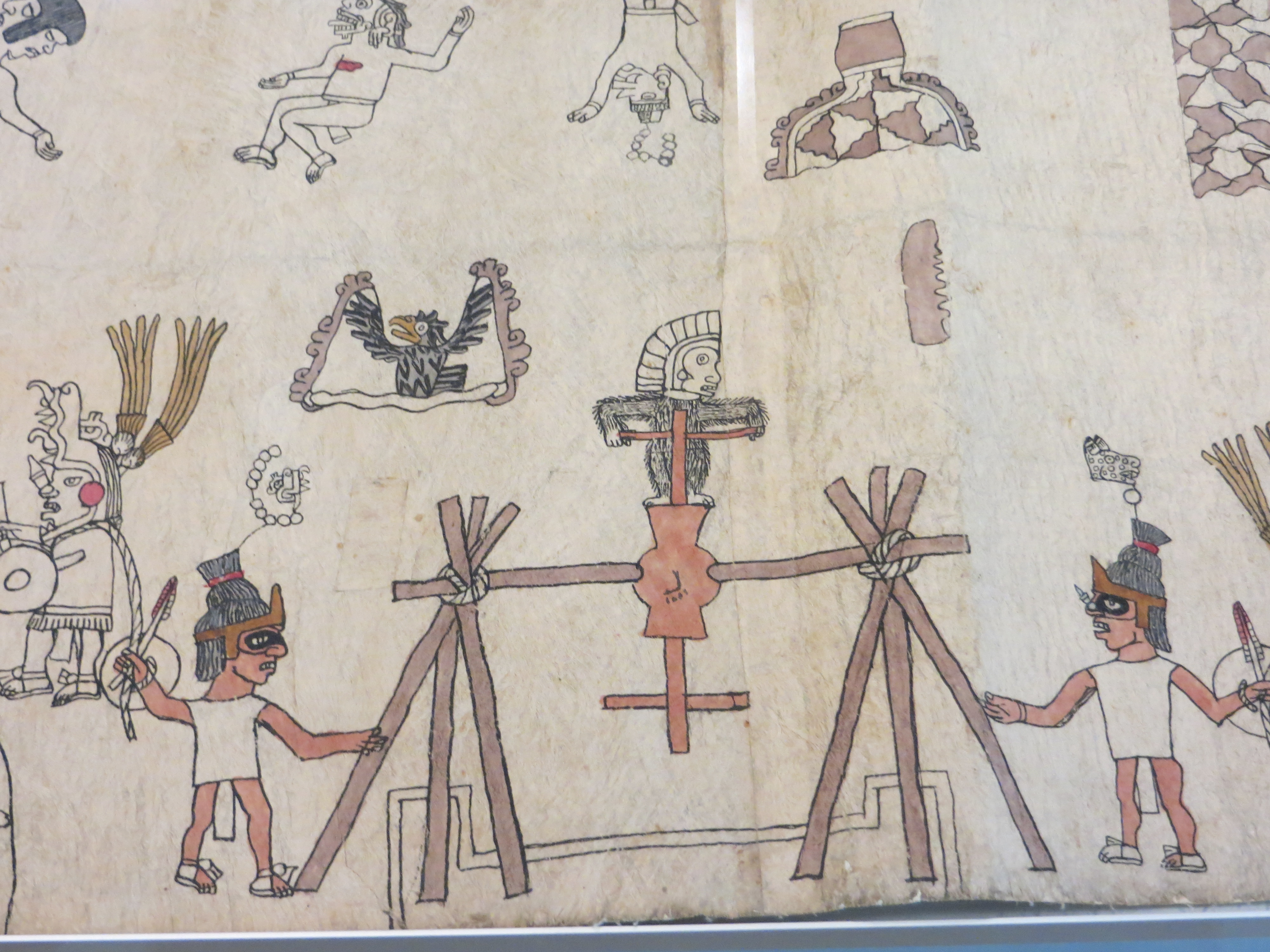
