= Mixtec Group =

Type of Mesoamerican codex

The Mixtec Group is the designation given by scholars to a number of mostly pre-Columbian documents from the Mixtec people of the state of Oaxaca in the southern part of the Republic of Mexico. They are distinguished by their principally historical and geographical content.

Included in the Mixtec Group are:

- The Codex Zouche-Nuttall
- The Codex Selden
- The Codex Colombino-Becker
- The Codex Waecker-Gotter
- The Codex Vindobonensis (or Vienna, as it is sometimes called)
- The Codex Bodley

== See also ==
- Mixtec writing
