= Codex Selden =

Mexican manuscript of Mixtec origin

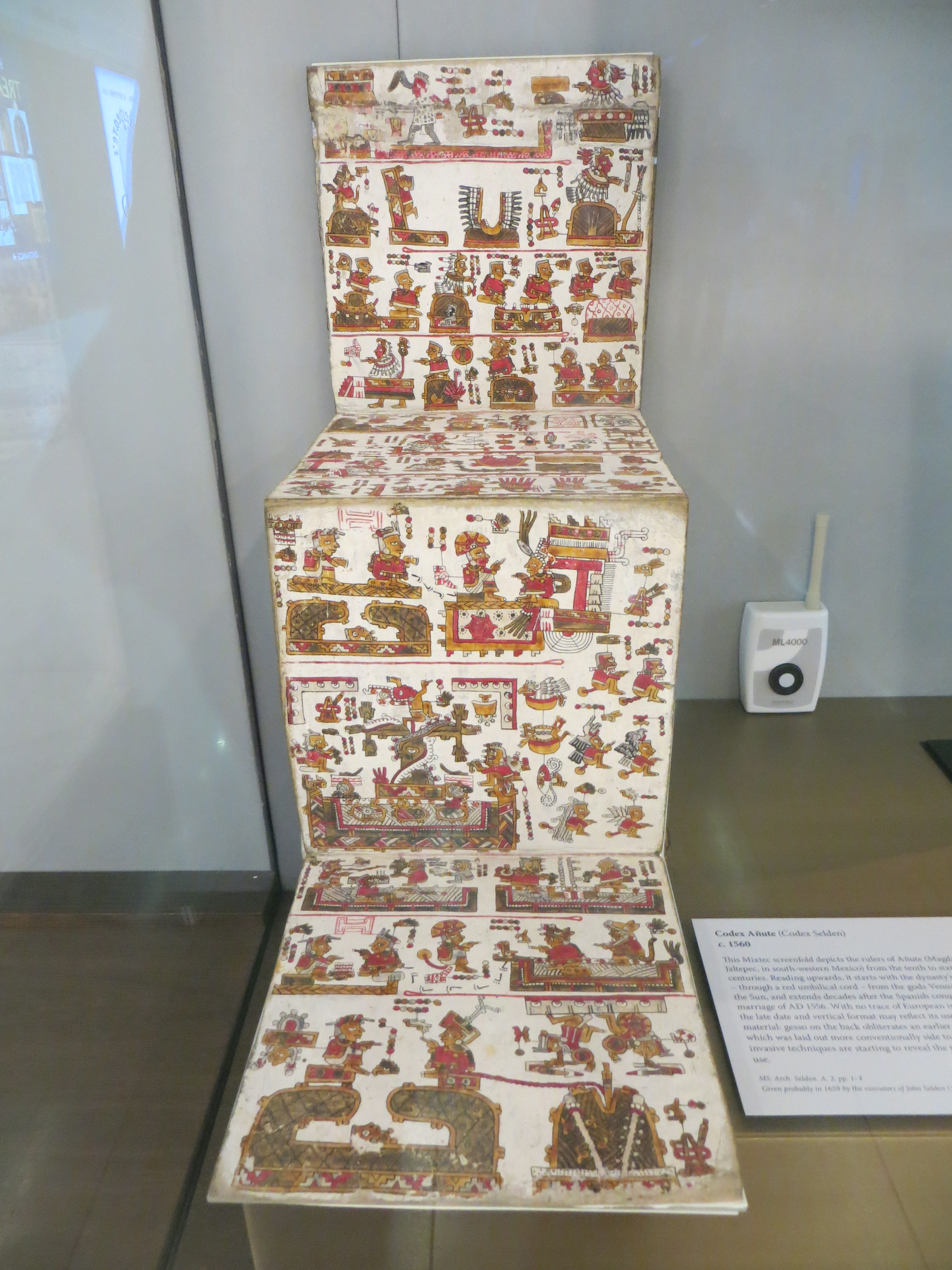
The Codex Selden on display at the Bodleian Library in Oxford

The Codex Selden (also known as the Codex Añute) is a Mexican manuscript of Mixtec origin. The codex is an account of the genealogy of the Jaltepec dynasty from the tenth to the 16th century. Codex Selden is possibly a fragment of a much longer improperly stored document. Although it was completed after the arrival of the conquistadors in the Mixtec region, it is considered one of the six pre-Hispanic Mixtec codices that survived the Spanish conquest of the Aztec Empire. The last date mentioned in the Codex is 1556, which can be interpreted as the date when the codex was finished.

The Codex belonged to the English jurist John Selden, who died in 1654 and left his collection of books and manuscripts at the University of Oxford. It is kept at the Bodleian Library in Oxford (shelfmark MS. Arch. Selden. A. 2).

In the 1950s, an accidental scratch revealed that the Selden Codex might overlay an earlier document later covered over with a layer of gypsum and chalk, a palimpsest. But given the fragility of the Codex, the faint tracings seen through the scratch could not be further revealed. Traditional x-ray techniques would not be effective since the tracings were organic in composition. In 2016, researchers reported that they had successfully unveiled the underlying pre-Columbian writing using a newer scanning technique. Early analysis of the writing suggests that the original writing includes a history of the Mixtec culture with hitherto unknown details.

The Bodleian Library holds four other Mesoamerican codices: Codex Bodley, Codex Laud, Codex Mendoza, and the Selden Roll, recently renamed The Roll of the New Fire.
