= Borgia Group =

Group of religious pre-Columbian documents from central Mexico

The first page of the Codex Fejérváry-Mayer.

The Borgia Group is the scholarly designation of a number of mostly pre-Columbian documents from central Mexico. In 1830–1831, they were first published in their entirety as colored lithographs of copies made by an Italian artist, Agustino Aglio, in volumes 2 and 3 of Lord Kingsborough's monumental work titled Antiquities of Mexico. They were named the “Codex Borgia Group” by Eduard Seler, who in 1887 began publishing a series of important elucidations of their contents.

The manuscripts have survived despite their having reached Europe at an early date. They are distinguished by their religious content, while the pre-Columbian codices of the Mixtec group are principally historical. The place of origin and the linguistic identity of the creators of the codices have been subject to debate, but may well be Puebla - Tlaxcala - Western Oaxaca. The main members of the Borgia Group are:

- The Codex Borgia, after which the group is named. The codex is itself named after Cardinal Stefano Borgia, who owned it before it was acquired by the Vatican Library.
- The Codex Cospi.
- The Codex Fejérváry-Mayer.
- The Codex Laud.
- The Codex Vaticanus B.

Also sometimes included are:

- The Aubin Manuscript No. 20, or Fonds mexicain 20.
- The Codex Porfirio Díaz.

== Bibliography ==
- Nicholson, H.B (2001). "Borgia Group of Pictorial Manuscripts". In Davíd Carrasco (ed.). The Oxford Encyclopedia of Mesoamerican Cultures: The Civilizations of Mexico and Central America. Vol. 1. Oxford University Press. ISBN 9780195188431.
- Nowotny, Karl Anton (2005). Tlacuilolli: style and contents of the Mexican pictorial manuscripts with a catalog of the Borgia Group. George A. Everett, Jr. and Edward B. Sisson (trans. and eds.), with a foreword by Ferdinand Anders. Norman: University of Oklahoma Press. ISBN 0-8061-3653-7. OCLC 56527102.
- Noguez, X; Lejarazu, M H; Paxton, M; Vela, E (August 2009). "Códices prehispánicos y coloniales tempranos" [Prehispanic and early colonial codices]. Arqueología Mexicana (in Spanish) (Edición especial,#31 ed.). México D.F.: Editorial Raíces, S.A. de C.V.: 24–44, 68–93. Archived from the original on 2014-07-14.
