= Codex Bodley =

Pre-conquest Mesoamerican pictographic manuscript

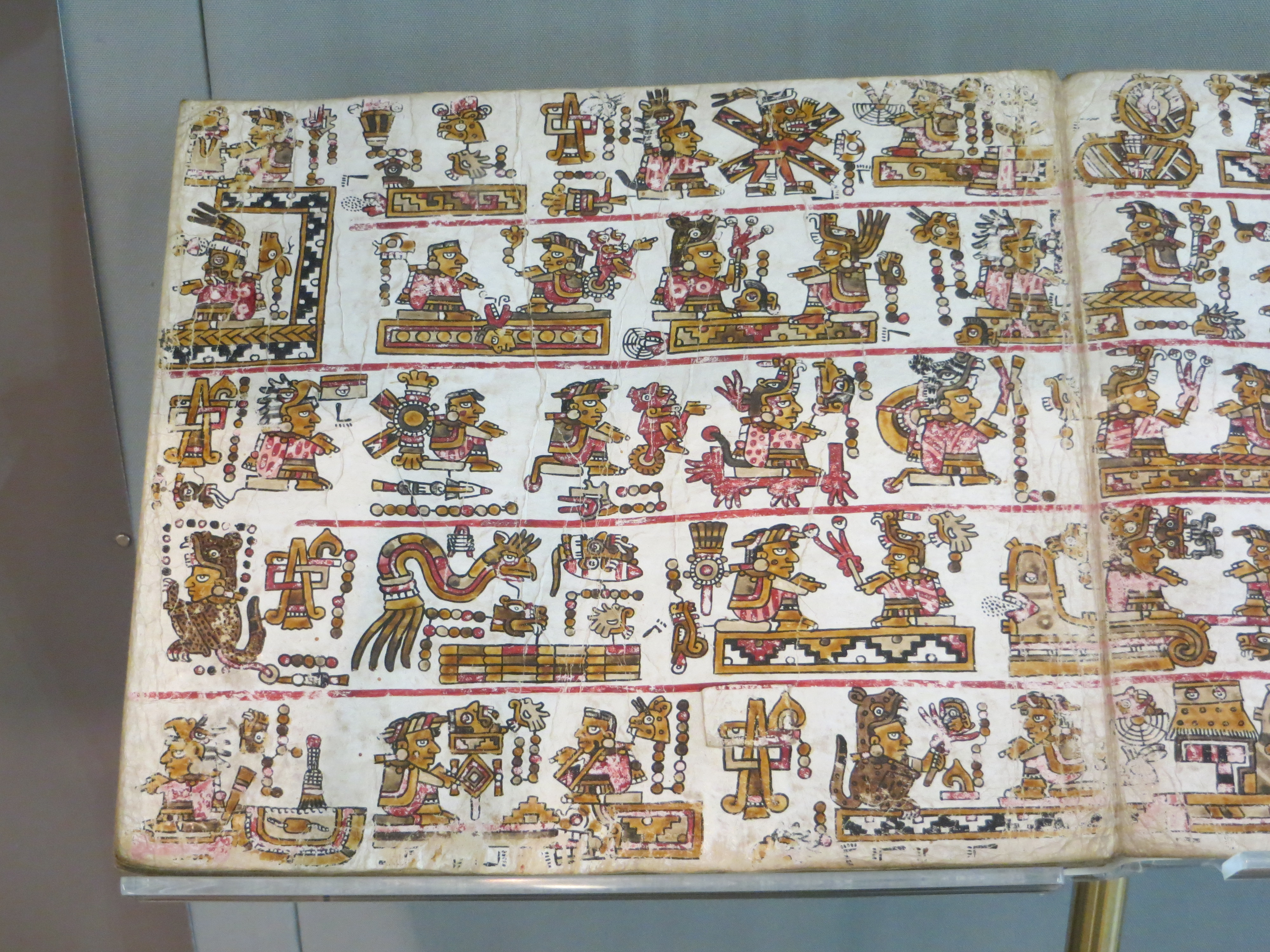
- The Bodley Codex on display at the Bodleian Library
- Material: Deerskin
- Size: 28 cm (11 in) high by 31 cm (12 in) wide
- Created: Circa 1500 AD
- Discovered: Unknown
- Present location: Bodleian Library, Oxford
- Registration: MS Mex. d. 1

The Codex Bodley is an important pictographic manuscript of the Mixtec Group and example of Mixtec historiography. It dates to circa 1500 in a variant of the Mixteca-Puebla style of Codex writing. Its colloquial name comes from the Bodleian Library at the University of Oxford, where it's been stored since the 17th century. It is also referred to as the "Codex Ñuu Tnoo" with Ñuu Tnoo-Huahi Andehui or Ñūù Tnúu-Ve'e Ándɨu (Modern day Tilantongo Mixtec) being the Mixtec name for an Indigenous settlement in Oaxaca, Mexico, also known as Tilantongo (directly from its Nahuatl name), which translates to "Black Town-Temple of Heaven". Tilantongo is the location of the modern town of Santiago Tilantongo.

== History ==
While the exact date of the codex's creation is difficult to establish, judging from its content and style, it was completed before the 1521 Spanish Conquest of Mexico, butlikely after the year 1500 due to the Mixtec lord Iya Nacuaa Teyusi Ñaña, translated as Eight Deer Jaguar Claw, being noted in the manuscript as being the dynasty's latest descendant, who is mentioned as the 11th century lord of Tilantogo in other Mixtec codices.

The history of the Codex Bodley before becoming part of the Bodleian Library's collection at the beginning of the 17th century is not known. Due to its description of the dynasty of Ñuu Tnoo (Tilantongo) on the obverse before relating the origin of another dynasty that ruled Tlaxiaco, as well as having many similarities to the Codex Selden, which is known to have come from the area, it's presumed to have come from this region of Oaxaca, but this is impossible to tell definitively. Its possible that it was brought up in legal battles with the descendants of thee Tilantongo dynasty to prove their claim to nobility before being sent off to Seville, and possibly becoming part of the General Archive of the Indies, explaining its presence in Europe. This is made even more plausible due to it being known that a Mixtec individual who changed their name to Don Felipe, after Felipe of Spain, filed numerous lawsuits in an attempt to protect their territorial privileges.

J. Eric Thompson, a British archaeologist and expert on the ancient Mayas, suggested that the manuscript's previous owner was Bishop Jerónimo Osório of Faro, Portugal before it was looted by Robert Devereux, 2nd Earl of Essex and given to his friend Thomas Bodley in the sixteenth century, where it later became part of the Bodleian Library.

The Bodleian Library holds four other Mesoamerican codices: Codex Laud, Codex Mendoza, Codex Selden and the Selden Roll.

== Physical description ==
The codex is made of deerskin that is 6.7 meters (ca. 22 feet) long. The animal skin was folded accordion style to form the distinct pages. Each page was then covered with a white base paint coat and then divided with horizontal red bands. The obverse has five bands while the reverse is only divided into four. It has traditionally been numbered based on Lord Kingsborough's facsimile of it in his Antiquities of Mexico. The condition of the original codex has faded over time, with many of the pages missing parts of the pictography. However, Kingsborough's facsimiles appear to have been made before this degradation, with the artist, Agostino Aglio using now faded colors of green and yellow that have, on the original, now faded to ocher or brown. However, this could also be attributed to Agostino's familiarity with color in such works due to his, by then, extensive work transcribing codices.

== Reading the Codex ==
The manuscript is read from right to left on two sides; the obverse and the reverse. The obverse consists of Pages 1 through 20 while the reverse starts on Page 40 and finishes on Page 21. The obverse ends with a genealogy and names Lord Eight Deer as the last/latest lord of the Tilantongo dynasty at the time of the codex's creation. On the reverse, Page 21 names Lord Eight Grass as being the last king of Tlaxiaco. Eight Grass's name-glyph is at bottom center, above the 9-Deer glyph (photo).

The obverse narrative begins on page 1, Band V, ending on Page 20, Band III. The reverse, however, follows numerous other stories, and as such is far more complex. Here, the upper two bands contain notes for the text while the rest relay the story. The main narrative on the reverse begins with Page 40, Band V, and proceeeds through Band V, VI, and III to Page 34. Band I then is the only one to supply notes. The story then is continued on Page 23, continuing across Bands V-I until Page 28 with no notes. The narrative splits on Page 28, with Bands I and II providing notes for the story while Bands III-V continue the genealogy until Psage 22.

== Genealogy ==
The Codex Bodley offers a relatively complete review of family relationships among the dynasties of the main cacicazgos (community kingdoms) in the Mixteca Alta region. This information is indispensable for anyone studying Mixtec kinship, policies around marital alliances, and peer polity interaction. Academic interest in the codex has focused on the Tilantongo and Tiaxiaco dynasties depicted on both sides of the manuscript, who once lived in the modern day Mexican State of Oaxaca.

In 1949, the archaeologist Alfonso Caso determined that the purpose of the genealogy was to calculate the line of descent for Tilantogo, and its relations to Teozacoalco (a still-occupied settlement) following a creation story after an event known as the "War of Heaven", as well as the saga of an individual known as Eight Deer, who is likely used to show the supposedly great future awaiting Tilantongo. Despite this, however, it is difficult to link the codex with any particular polity due to it listing the genealogies of numerous families that, at times, were in direct conflict with one-another.

The figure of Eight Deer is likely a metaphor for the greatness the polity of Tilantongo could reach, as evident from his many misadventures. After setting out on a daring quest, he challenges and beats the Sun God and Venus God to a ball game, "conquering" both and earning their favor, as well as a stone that carried what is referred to as the, "precious power of the West", referring to the River of Ashes (the Nexapa River) which was both the marker for the end of Mixtec influence as well as the realm of the fertility goddess, Old Lady One Grass. This likely had immense symbolic importance which, unfortunately, has largely been lost. After this, Eight Deer shoots a coyote on the Mountain of the Temple of Heaven to, what has been interpreted as meaning, gain the power needed to visit someone known as Lady Nine Grass in the Temple of Death, an ancient tomb to which one usually must surrender a soul to enter. Entering with what is presumed to be his lover, Lady Six Monkey, Eight Deer and she gain entrance by being granted an old bone, which allows them to enter unharmed. Once inside, they request to be married. However, they were refused by Lady Nine Grass, with Lady Six Monkey being ordered to marry Lord Eleven Wind of the Red and White Bundle family (the kings of Tilantongo) and Eight Deer being ordered to go to the Pacific Coast, west of the Mixteca Alta, and establish a kingdom until it is controlled by a great kingdom from Central Mexico. After he does so, he is invited by Cē Ācatl Topiltzin, King of the Toltec Empire, to receive a turquoise nose plug, a mark of kingship, and make an alliance. Meanwhile, back at Tilantongo, the young adult Lord 2 Rain 'Twenty Jaguars', as the text writes, went on a spiritual quest but failed to return, dying (at least physically) and leaving the kingdom without a leader. This allowed Eight Deer to come in, murder his half-brother, and claim the throne for himself.

Now king, Eight Deer blames the murder on two sons of his half sister, and, exactly 365 days after the death of his half brother, attacks the Red and White Bundle family, taking all of them prisoner except one man named Four Wind, the son of Six Monkey, who hides away in a cave for safety. Executing the captives but a woman named Thirteen Serpent, who he takes as a bride in order to inherit her estate, Thirteen Serpent cannot conceive of a child until, years later and after the second wife of four Eight Deer wed got pregnant, Thirteen Serpent is taken to a temple, has a vision of a large snake, and gives birth nine months later. Eight Deer would continue to rule until, on a hunting expedition, he was ambushed by Four Wind, who killed him and took power. He was buried with kingly honors and, although the Toltecs invaded to get revenge, eventually decided to make a practical peace with the new king of the region, Four Wind, who would wed one of Eight Deer's daughters and establish himself as the king of the region.

The reverse side of the codex follows the house of Red and White Bundle, the rivals of Eight Deer, and depicts things from their point of view. In the aftermath of the War of Heaven, before relating the last Red and White Bundle lord, Lord Eleven Wind married Lady Six Monkey, enraging Eight Deer who goes on to seize power of Tilantongo, killing off the Red and White Bundle family except for Four Wind. The genealogy then follows Four Wind and his descendants at a place known as the Palace of Flints. This lineage is said to end with the burning of the bodies of Lady One Grass and her son, Lord One Eagle, after which a surviving descendant known as Lord Seven Reed marries into the line of Teozacoalco. Importantly, he does not seem to be included in the lineage as expected, implying primogeniture perhaps wasn't the primary method of succession. After this, it shifts to focusing on the lords of Tlaxiaco, how Lord Seven Reed lost his kingdom to someone known as Lord Eight Jaguar, and his descendants' later rule over several different localities in the region.

The rest of the codex proceeds to follow the familial lines of the houses before ending with Lord Eight Grass on Page 21 (due to Kingsborough's confusing numbering). This Lord Eight Grass has been identified by Wigberto Jiménez Moreno, a Mexican ethnohistorian, as possibly the individual referred to by the Aztecs as Lord Malinalli (The Nahuatl word for grass) who was defeated by them in a war in 1503–1504, after which the Aztec extracted tribute from the region.

Interestingly, the codex references two major sites as the supposed point of creation of the royal houses, first at Achiutla on the obverse (with a figure emerging from a sacred tree likely at Achiutla, beginning the dynasty), and then at Apoala on the reverse, giving two seemingly contradictory locations for the origin of the noble houses. According to Friar Francisco de Burgoa, however, there were at least three different locations believed to be the origins of the Mixtec nobility, and possibly more implied by the Codex Zouche-Nuttall.

== Gallery ==
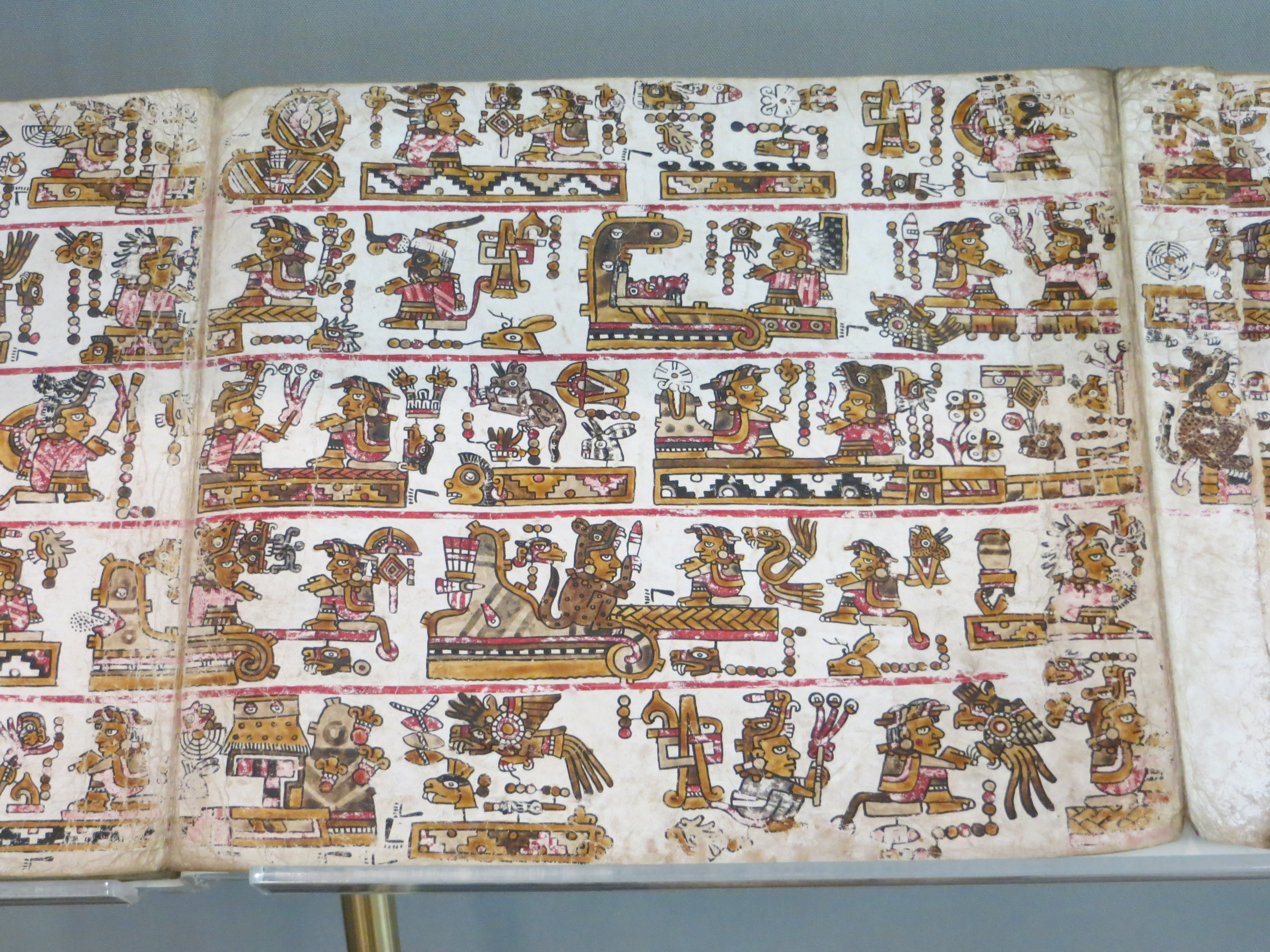
Other pages of the Bodley Codex on display at the Bodelian Library

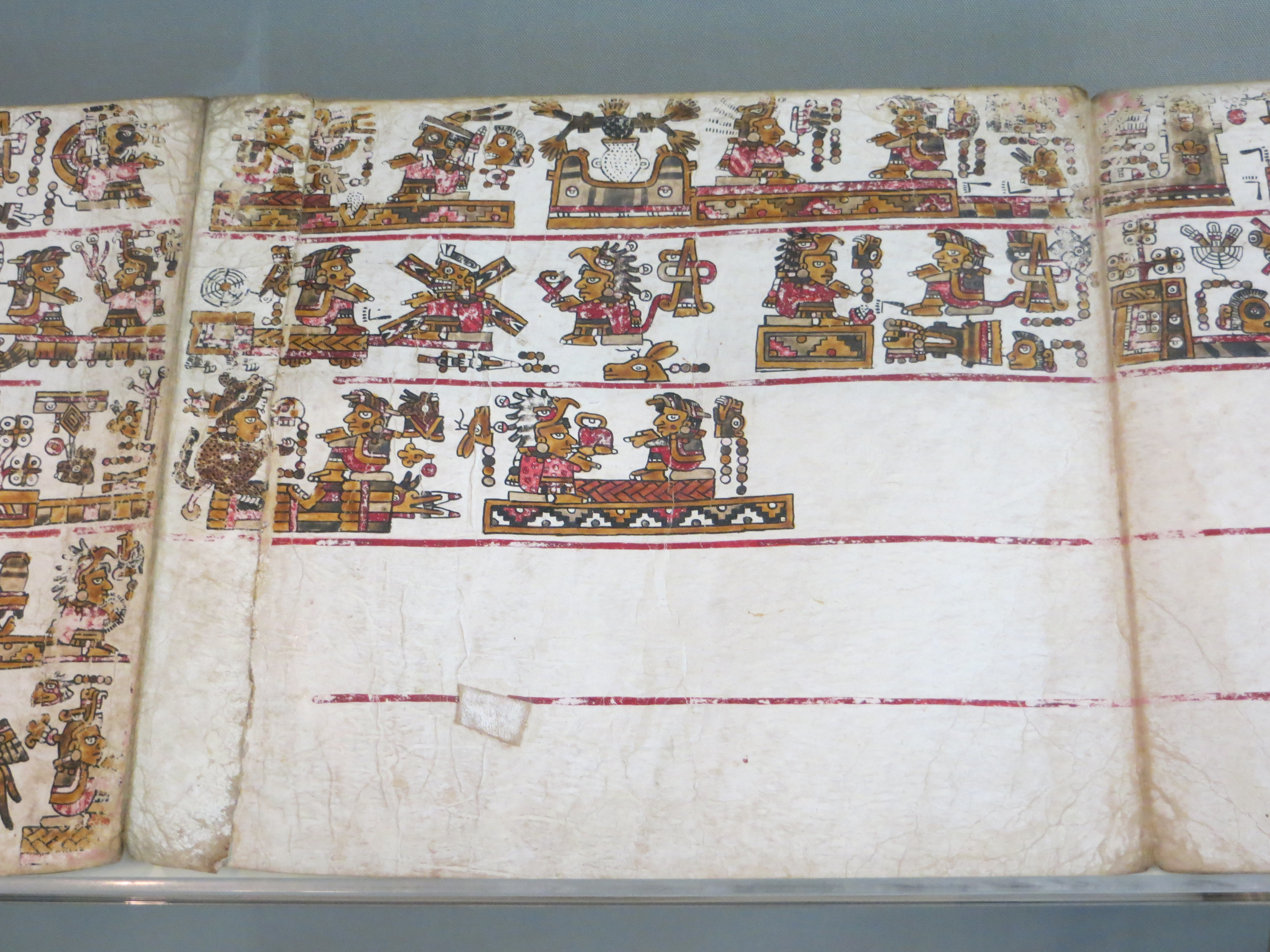

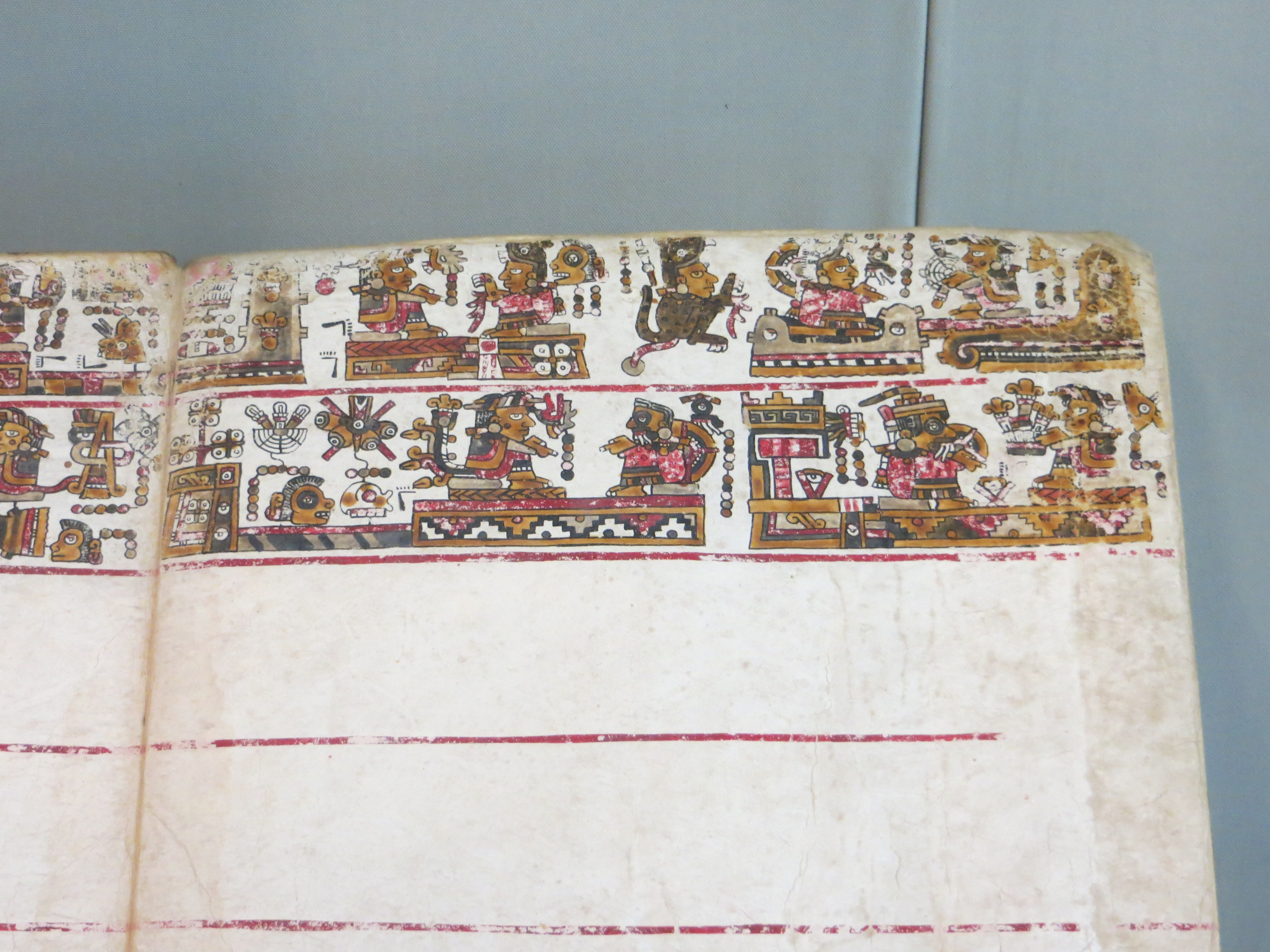
