= Codex Colombino =

Part of a Mixtec codex

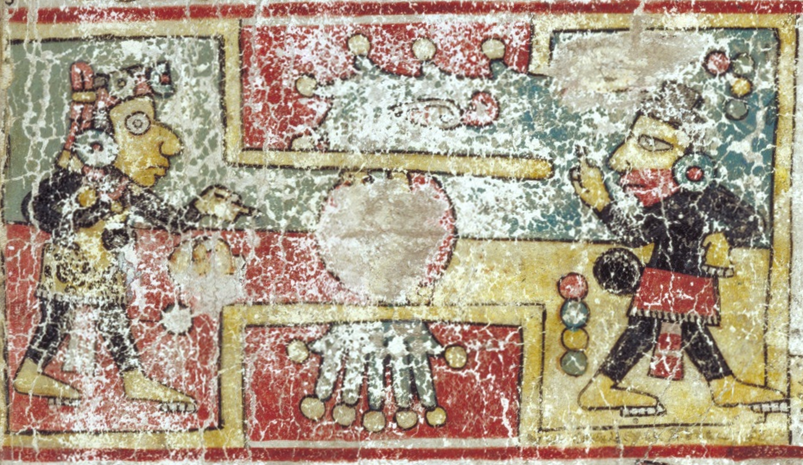
Extract of the page 2 of the codex Colombino, depicting a mesoamerican ballgame play.

The Codex Colombino is a part of a Mixtec codex held in the collection of the National Museum of Anthropology in Mexico City. It is one of only two Mesoamerican codices that remain in Mexican territory (the other being the Códice Maya de México). It deals with the genealogy, marriages and bellicose conquests of the Mixtec lord Eight Deer Jaguar Claw (fl. 11th century AD).

The other half of the Colombino Codex is known as "Becker I", and was purchased by Phillip Becker, a German collector, from the Aja-Villagómez family in Acatlán de Osorio, Puebla. It is currently in Vienna. For that reason, the entire codex often goes by the name Codex Colombino-Becker.

Several editions of both the Colombino and the Becker have been published. The most commonly used facsimile of the Colombino is accompanied by the commentary of Alfonso Caso (1966), and that of the Becker by the notes of Karl A. Nowotny (1961). For some of the history depicted in the Colombino-Becker, there are cognate accounts in other Mixtec codices, particularly the Codex Zouche-Nuttall.

== See also ==
- Mixtec Group

== Facsimile ==
Codices Becker I/II: Vienna, Museum for Ethnology, Inv.-Nr. 60306 und 60307, pre-colonial/1st half of the 16th century; Akademische Druck- u. Verlagsanstalt (ADEVA), Graz 1961. Truecolour facsimile edition of 20 pictograph pages in original size, leporello folding, mounted on cloth. In half leather portfolio. Commentary: K. A. Novotny (with English summary). CODICES SELECTI, Vol. IV.
