= Codex Vaticanus B =

Pre-Columbian Middle American manuscript

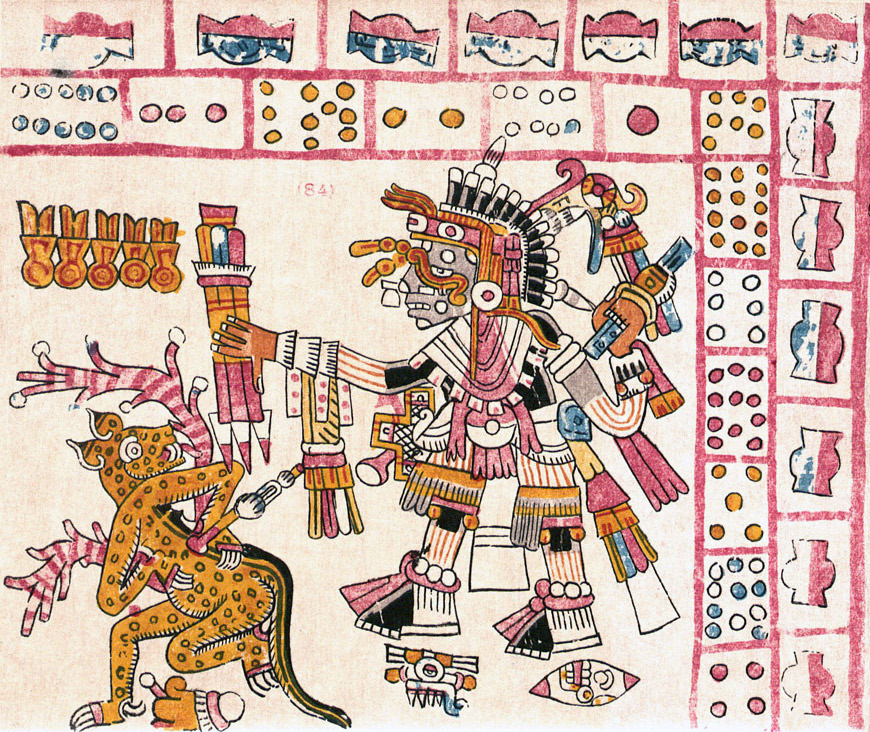
Page from Codex Vaticanus B

Codex Vaticanus B, (The Vatican, Bibl. Vat., Vat.Lat.3773) also known as Codex Vaticanus 3773, Codice Vaticano Rituale, and Códice Fábrega, is a pre-Columbian Middle American pictorial manuscript, probably from the Puebla part of the Mixtec region, with a ritual and calendrical content. It is a member of the Borgia Group of manuscripts. It is currently housed at the Vatican Library.

== Description ==
Codex Vaticanus B is a screenfold book made from ten segments of deerskin joined together, measuring 7240 centimeters in total length. These segments have been folded in 49 pages in an accordion fashion, each page measuring 14.5 by 12.5 centimeters, making it one of the smallest Mesoamerican codices. The deerskin has been covered by a bright white burnished gesso. Red lines are used to frame and divide parts of compositions, black outlines are used to demarcate figures, and finally a limited set of approximately six colours has been used to colour it. The book keeps its original covers, two wooden tables that have been pasted to the extremes of the deerskin strip. Originally, this binding was covered with precious stones: today, only a single turquoise tile remains.

== History ==
The history of this manuscript prior to 1596, the date where it appears in a Vatican Catalog where it was assigned the number 3773, is currently unknown. Its original catalog entry reads like this: "Religion of the Indians in drawings, images and hieroglyphs, on papers with boards. The paper has a width of 7 fingers and extends to 32 palms, with pictures in both sides. It has been folded as a screenfold and acquired the form of a book." It has been speculated that the book arrived to the Vatican alongside Codex Vaticanus 3738.

The codex was perhaps first mentioned by Michele Mercatti in his work on the obelisks of Rome (1589), and a single page was published by Athanasius Kircher in his work Oedipus Aegyptiacus (1652). It was first noticed by Lino Fábrega, a Jesuit scholar who attempted the first interpretation of Codex Borgia. Alexander von Humboldt reproduced other pages, and the first complete edition was that of Lord Kingsborough. In 1896, Joseph Florimond, duke of Loubat prepared another facsimile, and years later financed a commentary by Eduard Seler, published in 1902 in London. A modern facsimile by Ferdinand Anders appeared in 1972, published by the Akademische Druck- u. Verlagsanstalt (ADEVA) in Graz. Another version of the ADEVA facsimile photographs, with a commentary in Spanish by Anders and Marteen Jansen, appeared in 1993, co-edited by ADEVA and the Mexican editorial Fondo de Cultura Económica.

== Contents ==
Codex Vaticanus B can be divided in 31 sections, which contain a complex presentation of the 260-day Mesoamerican divinatory calendar, the Tonalpohualli. Contents are given as proposed by Elizabeth Hill Boone.

1. In extenso almanac (1-8).
2. Forty days organized as a grouped list, associated with five or six pairs of figures (9a-11a).
3. Seventy six days organized as a group list, associated with six deities in five temples and a construction (9b-11b).
4. Almanac for digging (12).
5. Thirty-two day signs arranged as an encircling list around two temples (13-14).
6. Thirty-one day signs arranged between a night temple and a day-temple (15-16).
7. Directional almanac with a tonalpohualli organized as a compressed table according to four gods and cosmic trees (17-18).
8. Night-sky bearers. (19a-23a).
9. Lords of the night (19b-23b).
10. Animal attacks (24-27).
11. Day sign patrons (28-32).
12. Birth almanac (33a-42a).
13. Marriage almanac (42b-33b).
14. Rain almanac (43-48).
15. Reverse side begins. Tonalpohualli in trecenas (49-68).
16. Rain almanac associated with the four quarters (69).
17. Twenty day signs associated with 4 deities, beginning with 11 Movement (70).
18. Forty-five days associated with nine earth mouths in nine cells, five days to each cell (71).
19. Pulque drinkers (72).
20. Four serpents (73).
21. Corporeal/diagrammatic almanac (74).
22. Corporeal almanac arranged over Quetzalcoatl and Mictlantecuhtli (76).
23. Corporeal almanac with a double figure of Quetzalcoatl/Mictlantecuhtli (76).
24. Deer of the east and north (77 right).
25. The five Cihuateteo and Macuiltonaleque (77 left-79).
26. Venus almanac (80-84).
27. Corporeal almanac of twenty days arranged around an opossum and a monkey (85-86)
28. Day sign patrons (87-94).
29. Twenty day sings associated with four scorpions (95 right).
30. First four trecenas radiating around a central flint knife (95 left).
31. Corporeal almanac or 'deer of our flesh' (59).

== See also ==
- Codex Vaticanus A
- Codex Borgia
- Codex Laud
- Codex Vindobonensis Mexicanus I
