= Codex Laud =

Mesoamerican manuscript

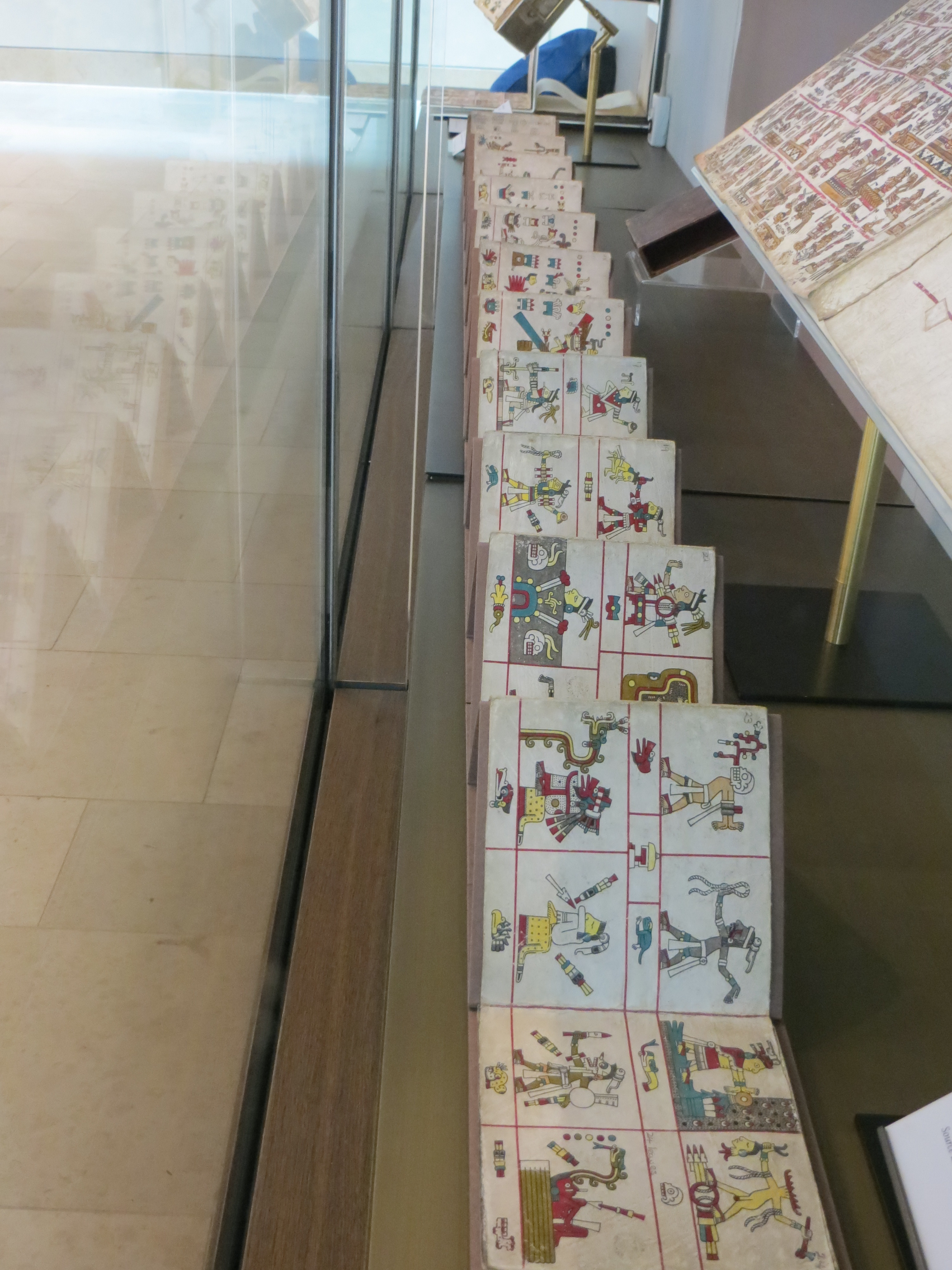
The Codex Laud on display at the Bodleian Library in Oxford

The Codex Laud, or Laudianus, is a Mesoamerican codex, possibly from the fifteenth-century, named for its former owner William Laud. It is part of the Borgia Group and housed at the Bodleian Library, Oxford.

The codex is an animal hide pictorial manuscript consisting of 24 leaves (48 pages). Represented is the 260-day calendar, or tonalpohualli, as well as rituals and offerings. The codex enters the historical record in 1636 as part of Laud's second donation to the Bodleian.

It is published (with an "Introduction" by C. A. Burland) in Volume XI of CODICES SELECTI of the Akademische Druck- u. Verlagsanstalt, Graz.

The Bodleian Library holds four other Mesoamerican codices, including Codex Bodley, Codex Mendoza, Codex Selden and the Selden Roll.

== Gallery ==
Digitaized version of the first page of the Codex Laud.

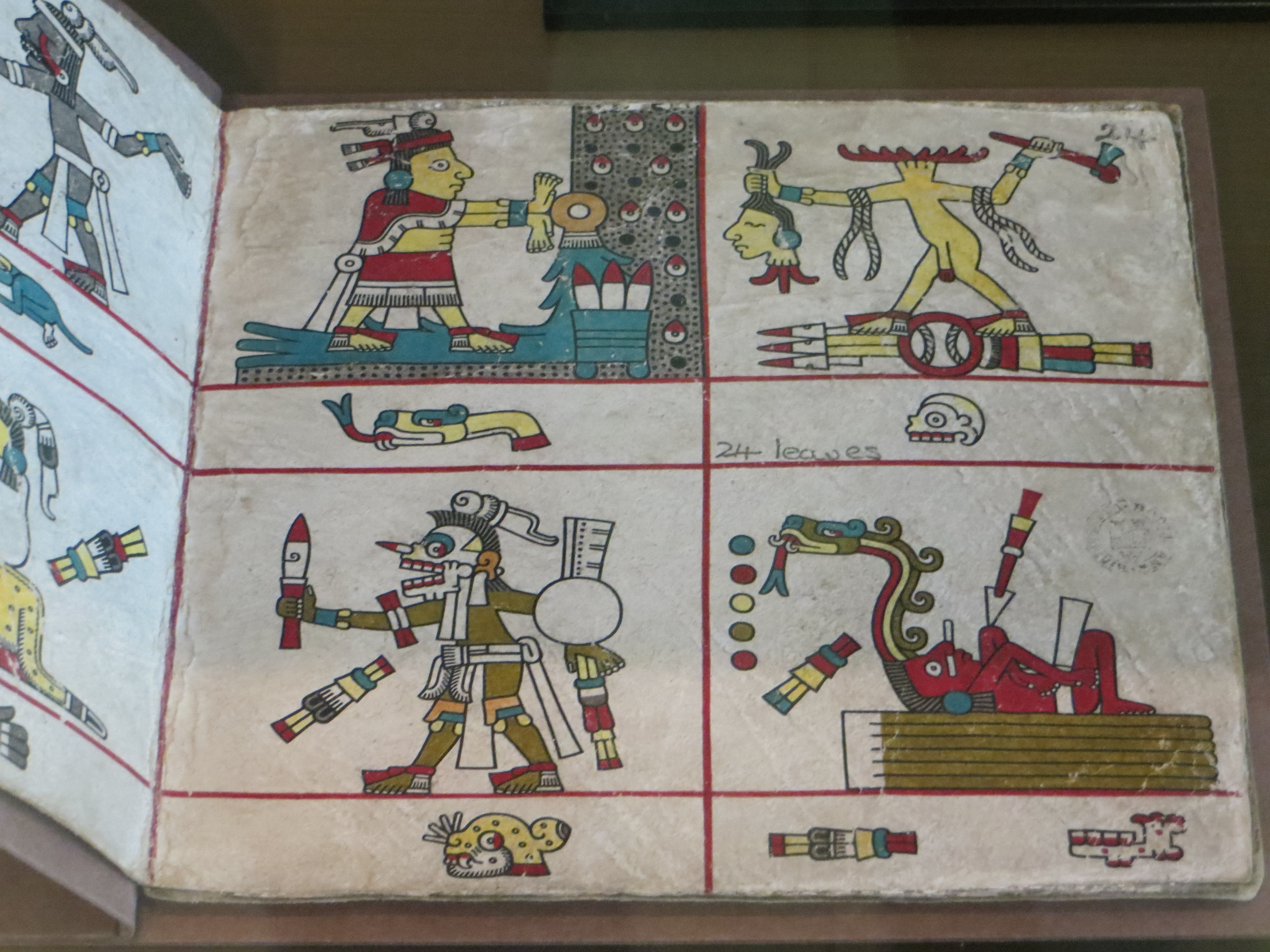
Codex Laud on display at the Bodleian Library.

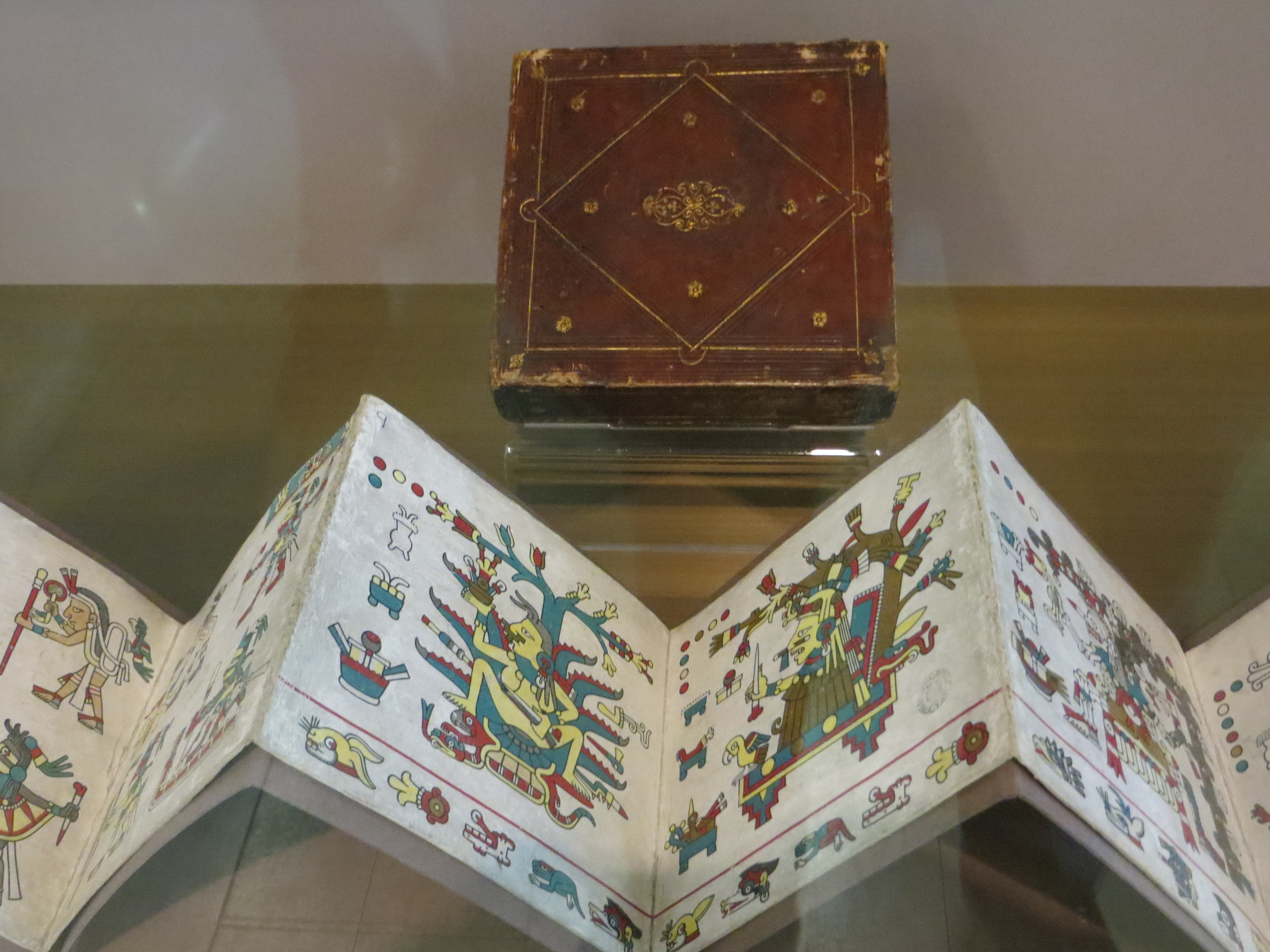
Codex Laud on display at the Bodleian Library.

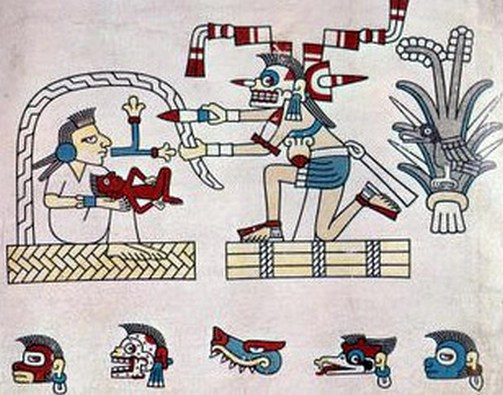
Illustration showing Texcatlipoca.
