= List of Guggenheim Fellowships awarded in 1955 =

Two hundred and forty-eight Guggenheim Fellowships were awarded in 1955, with grants totaling at $968,000.

== 1955 U.S. and Canadian Fellows ==
Category	Field of Study	Fellow	Institutional association	Research topic	Notes	Ref
Creative Arts	Fiction	Saul Bellow	Bard College	Writing	Also won in 1948	
Creative Arts	Fiction	Hortense Calisher		Writing	Also won in 1952	
Creative Arts	Fiction	Marie Campbell	Indiana University	Southern folk materials in creative writing	Also won in 1944	
Creative Arts	Fiction	Kermit H. Hunter		Writing		
Creative Arts	Fiction	André Langevin	Canadian Broadcasting Corporation	Writing		
Creative Arts	Fine Art	Edris Eckhardt			Also won in 1959	
Creative Arts	Fine Art	Ben Kamihira		Painting	Also won in 1956	
Creative Arts	Fine Art	Seong Moy		Color woodcut illustrations		
Creative Arts	Fine Art	Hobson Pittman		Painting		
Creative Arts	Fine Art	Sahl Swarz		Sculpture	Also won in 1958	
Creative Arts	Fine Art	Donald S. Thrall	Cass Technical High School	Painting		
Creative Arts	Music Composition	Walter E. Aschaffenburg	Oberlin Conservatory of Music	Composing	Also won in 1973	
Creative Arts	Music Composition	Henry Dreyfuss Brant		Composing	Also won in 1946	
Creative Arts	Music Composition	Peggy Glanville-Hicks		Composing	Also won in 1957	
Creative Arts	Music Composition	Hall Franklin Overton		Composing	Also won in 1967	
Creative Arts	Music Composition	Russell Smith		Composing		
Creative Arts	Music Composition	Hugo Weisgall		Composing	Also won in 1960 and 1966	
Creative Arts	Photographer	Robert Frank		Photographs culminating in The Americans	Also won in 1956	
Creative Arts	Photographer	Todd Webb	University of Texas	Following the trail of the Forty Niners	Also won in 1956	
Creative Arts	Poetry	Barbara Gibbs Golffing		Writing	Also won in 1956	
Creative Arts	Poetry	Barbara Howes		Writing		
Humanities	American Literature	Harold William Blodgett	Union College			
Humanities	American Literature	Charles Feidelson, Jr.	Yale University	Aesthetics of Henry James, with special reference to his later works		
Humanities	American Literature	Joseph N. Frank		Literary criticism, 1900-present	Also won in 1975	
Humanities	American Literature	Ernest Samuels	Northwestern University	Life and times of Henry Adams	Also won in 1971	
Humanities	Bibliography	Irene Dakin Paden		Historical and bibliographical studies of the exploration and settlement of Oregon and California		
Humanities	Biography	Irvin Ehrenpreis	Indiana University	Jonathan Swift	Also won in 1961	
Humanities	British History	Hessel Duncan Hall				
Humanities	Classics	Emmett L. Bennett, Jr.	Yale University	Epigraphy and languages of the Minoan and Mycenaean inscriptions		
Humanities	Classics	James Frank Gilliam	University of Iowa	Auxiliaries of the Roman Imperial army		
Humanities	Classics	Arthur Ernest Gordon	University of California, Berkeley	Latin inscriptions on stone of the period of the Roman Republic		
Humanities	Classics	George Emmanuel Mylonas	Washington University in St. Louis	Excavations of the ancient Greek city of Eleusis	Also won in 1968	
Humanities	Classics	James Henry Oliver	Johns Hopkins University	History of Athens under the rule of Rome	Also won in 1946	
Humanities	Classics	William Kendrick Pritchett	University of California, Berkeley	Ancient Greek battlefields	Also won in 1951	
Humanities	Classics	Morton Smith	Brown University	History of religion, particularly the Eastern Church in the 4th century AD		
Humanities	East Asian Studies	John Frank Cady	Ohio University		Also won in 1960	
Humanities	East Asian Studies	Ch'ên Shou-yi	Pomona College and Claremont Graduate School	History of cultural relations between Eastern Asia and the Western World in the 17th and 18th centuries		
Humanities	East Asian Studies	Ferdinand Lessing			Also won in 1952	
Humanities	Economic History	Bray Hammond		History of American banking from the time of the Civil War to the mid-1930s	Also won in 1950	
Humanities	English Literature	Mark Eccles	University of Wisconsin	Lives of Shakespeare's Warwickshire contemporaries		
Humanities	English Literature	William Irvine	Stanford University	Impressionism in English poetry, from Wordsworth to Browning	Also won in 1962	
Humanities	English Literature	Paul Harold Kocher	Claremont Graduate School and Pomona College	Interpretation of thought of Francis Bacon	Also won in 1946	
Humanities	English Literature	Carl Woodring	University of Wisconsin			
Humanities	Fine Arts Research	Bartlett H. Hayes, Jr.	Addison Gallery of American Art			
Humanities	Fine Arts Research	Horst Woldemar Janson	New York University	History of art and artists of the Italian Renaissance	Also won in 1948	
Humanities	Folklore and Popular Culture	Harold Courlander			Also won in 1948	
Humanities	Folklore and Popular Culture	Francis Peabody Magoun, Jr.	Harvard University			
Humanities	Folklore and Popular Culture	Frederic Ramsey, Jr.		Afro-American music of Alabama, Louisiana, and Mississippi	Also won in 1953	
Humanities	Folklore and Popular Culture	Stith Thompson	Indiana University			
Humanities	French Literature	Irving Putter	University of California, Berkeley	Poetry of Leconte de Lisle		
Humanities	German and East European History	Friedrich Engel-Janosi	Catholic University of America	Relations between the Vatican and the Habsburg monarchy		
Humanities	German and Scandinavian Literature	Liselotte Dieckmann	Washington University in St. Louis	Hieroglyphics as a literary symbol		
Humanities	German and Scandinavian Literature	George Clarence Schoolfield	University of Buffalo	The musician as a figure in German creative literature		
Humanities	German and Scandinavian Literature	Detlev Walther Schumann	University of Illinois	French emigrees in Schleswig-Holstein around 1800		
Humanities	History of Science and Technology	Eugene Maximilian Karl Geiling				
Humanities	History of Science and Technology	Marie Boas Hall	Brandeis University			
Humanities	History of Science and Technology	Cyril Stanley Smith	University of Chicago	Historical study of the development of metallurgy	Also won in 1978	
Humanities	History of Science and Technology	Glenn Allen Sonnedecker	University of Wisconsin	Influence of new drugs, found in the New World, upon European medicine and pharmacy		
Humanities	Intellectual and Cultural History	Gertrude Himmelfarb			Also won in 1957	
Humanities	Intellectual and Cultural History	Henry Stuart Hughes	Stanford University	Development of social and moral ideals in Western Europe, 1890-1930		
Humanities	Intellectual and Cultural History	Gerhard Masur	Sweet Briar College	Intellectual history of Europe in the 20th century		
Humanities	Italian Literature	Bernard Weinberg	Northwestern University	Italian Renaissance literary criticism	Also won in 1945	
Humanities	Latin American Literature	Robert Cooper West	Louisiana State University	Historical-geographical studies of mining activities in central Mexico and Honduras during the early Spanish period		
Humanities	Linguistics	Peter Alexis Boodberg			Also won in 1938 and 1963	
Humanities	Linguistics	Denzel Raybourne Carr	University of California, Berkeley	Malayan and Indonesian languages		
Humanities	Linguistics	Henry R. Kahane	University of Illinois	Linguistic system of modern Greek	Also won in 1962	
Humanities	Linguistics	Max Weinreich	City College of New York	History of the Yiddish language	Also won in 1956	
Humanities	Medieval History	Gaines Post	University of Wisconsin		Also won in 1939	
Humanities	Medieval History	Brian Tierney	Catholic University of America	Ecclesiastical law in relation to the relief of poverty in the Middle Ages	Also won in 1956	
Humanities	Medieval Literature	Kemp Malone				
Humanities	Medieval Literature	Rossell Hope Robbins		Development of lyric poetry in England, 1200-1500		
Humanities	Music Research	Yury Arbatsky	Newberry Library	Historical studies of music and musical instruments, from pre-Hellenic times to the fall of Constantinople	Also won in 1956	
Humanities	Music Research	Noah Greenberg		Medieval and Renaissance music and the traditions of its performance		
Humanities	Music Research	Eta Harich-Schneider			Also won in 1953 and 1954	
Humanities	Music Research	Bernard Stambler				
Humanities	Music Research	Oliver Strunk	Princeton University	Music of the Byzantine liturgy in its medieval form	Also won in 1951	
Humanities	Music Research	Walter Lincoln Woodfill	University of Delaware	English music and musicians in the 17th century		
Humanities	Near Eastern Studies	Ernest Bender	University of Pennsylvania	Old Gujarati language of India and its literature		
Humanities	Near Eastern Studies	Jacob Joel Finkelstein	Yale University	Political and socio-economic conditions in the period preceding the fall of the first Babylonian Empire		
Humanities	Philosophy	Irving Marmer Copi	University of Michigan	Recent developments in symbolic logic and theory of language		
Humanities	Philosophy	Philip Merlan	Scripps College	Influence of Aristotle on subsequent thought		
Humanities	Philosophy	Charles Egerton Osgood	University of Illinois	Psychology of the communication process	Also won in 1972	
Humanities	Renaissance History	Josephine Waters Bennett	Hunter College	History of the Renaissance in England	Also won in 1944	
Humanities	Renaissance History	William Nelson	Columbia University	The prince in the literature of the Renaissance		
Humanities	Renaissance History	Craig R. Thompson	Lawrence College	Commentaries on the works of Erasmus	Also won in 1942, 1954, and 1968	
Humanities	Renaissance History	Franklin B. Williams Jr.	Georgetown University	Literary patronage and conditions of publication in Renaissance England		
Humanities	Russian Studies	Wacław Lednicki	University of California, Berkeley	Cultural and political trends in Russia and Poland prior to Polish independence	Also won in 1956	
Humanities	Science Writing	Gobind Behari Lal				
Humanities	Slavic Literature	Dmitry Cizevsky	Harvard University	Slavic literature of the baroque period		
Humanities	Spanish and Portuguese Literature	José de Onís	University of Colorado	Attitudes of Spanish-American writers towards the US since 1900		
Humanities	Spanish and Portuguese Literature	Oliver Howard Hauptmann	Grinnell College	Certain medieval Judaeo-Spanish Biblical manuscripts		
Humanities	Theatre Arts	Monroe Lippman	Tulane University			
Humanities	Theatre Arts	Charles Ensign Rogers	Amherst College			
Humanities	United States History	John Richard Alden	University of Nebraska	History of the South during the American Revolution		
Humanities	United States History	Thomas B. Alexander	Georgia State Teachers College	Persistence of the principles of the American Whigs, 1860-1900		
Humanities	United States History	Shelby Foote		Civil War as seen from the point of view of the participants	Also won in 1956 and 1959	
Humanities	United States History	Norman Francis Furniss	Colorado A&M University	History of the Mormon War		
Humanities	United States History	Eric Frederick Goldman	Princeton University	History of modern American isolationism		
Humanities	United States History	Edward Chase Kirkland	Bowdoin College	Attitudes and policies of the business community in the US, 1860-1900		
Humanities	United States History	Bessie Louise Pierce			Also won in 1957	
Humanities	United States History	George Wilson Pierson	Yale University	Effects of the American character on the migration of men and of culture		
Humanities	United States History	Frank Everson Vandiver	Washington University in St. Louis	Stonewall Jackson		
Natural Science	Applied Math	Leslie Stephen George Kovasznay	Johns Hopkins University	Turbulence in compressible flow		
Natural Science	Applied Math	Wulf Bernard Kunkel	University of California, Berkeley	Gaseous electronics	Also won in 1972	
Natural Science	Applied Math	James Edward Storer	Harvard University			
Natural Science	Astronomy and Astrophysics	Louis Craig Green	Haverford College	Procedures for finding atomic wave functions of high accuracy		
Natural Science	Astronomy and Astrophysics	Martin Schwarzschild	Princeton University	Stellar evolution		
Natural Science	Astronomy and Astrophysics	John Hughes Tinlot	University of Rochester	Research at Ecole Polytechnique in Paris		
Natural Science	Chemistry	Isadore Amdur	Massachusetts Institute of Technology			
Natural Science	Chemistry	Paul Doughty Bartlett			Also won in 1971	
Natural Science	Chemistry	Milton Burton	University of Notre Dame	Radiation chemistry and the chemistry of electrical discharges		
Natural Science	Chemistry	Robert Hugh Cole	Brown University		Also won in 1961	
Natural Science	Chemistry	Burris Bell Cunningham	University of California, Berkeley	Thermodynamic and magnetic properties of the actinide and lanthanide elements		
Natural Science	Chemistry	John Courtney Decius	Oregon State College	Molecular force constants and dipoles		
Natural Science	Chemistry	Paul Delahay	Louisiana State University		Also won in 1971	
Natural Science	Chemistry	Stanley Jerome Cristol	University of Colorado	Certain bridged polycyclic compounds	Also won in 1980	
Natural Science	Chemistry	George Dawson Halsey, Jr.	University of Washington	Absorption and solution of the noble gases		
Natural Science	Chemistry	George Simms Hammond	Iowa State College	Organic mechanisms		
Natural Science	Chemistry	Harold Hart	Michigan State College	Role of the cyclopropane ring in organic reaction mechanisms		
Natural Science	Chemistry	Ralph A. James	University of California, Los Angeles			
Natural Science	Chemistry	David Lipkin	Washington University in St. Louis	Chemistry of nucleic acids and organic phosphorus compounds generally		
Natural Science	Chemistry	Lynne L. Merritt, Jr.	Indiana University	Crystal structure for chelate complexes		
Natural Science	Chemistry	Richard M. Noyes				
Natural Science	Chemistry	Isadore Perlman	University of California, Berkeley	Theory of nuclear spectroscopic states	Also won in 1962	
Natural Science	Chemistry	Henry Rapoport	University of California, Berkeley	Heterocyclic nitrogen compounds of natural origin		
Natural Science	Chemistry	Calvin Lee Stevens	Wayne State University	Synthetic organic chemistry and reaction mechanisms		
Natural Science	Chemistry	Julian M. Sturtevant	Yale University	Kinetics and the heats of very rapid enzymatic reactions		
Natural Science	Chemistry	Henry Taube	University of Chicago		Also won in 1949	
Natural Science	Chemistry	Alfred Lawrence Wilds	University of Wisconsin			
Natural Science	Chemistry	John Warren Williams				
Natural Science	Earth Science	Isaac Barshad	University of California, Berkeley	Oil mineralogy and the formation of soils		
Natural Science	Earth Science	Kenneth E. Caster	University of Cincinnati	Rocks and fossils in Tasmania	Also won in 1943 and 1954	
Natural Science	Earth Science	Ernst Cloos				
Natural Science	Earth Science	Maurice Ewing	Columbia University		Also won in 1938, 1939, and 1953	
Natural Science	Earth Science	Richard Holmes Merriam	University of Southern California	Strength of the concretes used in ancient Roman buildings		
Natural Science	Mathematics	Philip J. Davis	National Bureau of Standards			
Natural Science	Mathematics	Marshall Hall, Jr.	Ohio State University		Also won in 1970	
Natural Science	Mathematics	Edwin Hewitt			Also won in 1945	
Natural Science	Mathematics	Gerhard Paul Hochschild	University of Illinois	Algebraic cosmology theory		
Natural Science	Mathematics	Arthur J. Lohwater	University of Michigan	Behavior of meromorphic functions at the boundary of the region of definition		
Natural Science	Mathematics	Edward James McShane	University of Virginia	Theory of partially ordered spaces		
Natural Science	Mathematics	Alfred Tarski	University of California, Berkeley	Mathematics and abstract algebra	Also won in 1941 and 1942	
Natural Science	Mathematics	Alexander Weinstein	University of Maryland	Elliptic and hyperbolic equations of higher order	Also won in 1954	
Natural Science	Mathematics	George W. Whitehead	Massachusetts Institute of Technology			
Natural Science	Mathematics	Daniel Zelinsky	Northwestern University	Linear compactness		
Natural Science	Medicine and Health	David K. Detweiler	University of Pennsylvania	Cardiac cycle in horses		
Natural Science	Medicine and Health	Oskar Hirsch				
Natural Science	Medicine and Health	Cyril Norman Hugh Long	Yale University			
Natural Science	Medicine and Health	Malcolm Ray Miller	Stanford University	Lower vertebrate animals	Also won in 1966	
Natural Science	Medicine and Health	Lloyd Milton Nyhus				
Natural Science	Medicine and Health	Donal Sheehan				
Natural Science	Molecular and Cellular Biology	Thomas Foxen Anderson	University of Pennsylvania	Multiplication of bacterial viruses		
Natural Science	Molecular and Cellular Biology	Paul Delos Boyer	University of Minnesota	Mechanism of enzymic reactions		
Natural Science	Molecular and Cellular Biology	Waldo E. Cohn	Oak Ridge National Laboratory		Also won in 1962	
Natural Science	Molecular and Cellular Biology	Everett Ross Dempster	University of California, Berkeley	Inheritance of continuously variable characteristics		
Natural Science	Molecular and Cellular Biology	Raymond Nicholas Doetsch	University of Maryland	Rumen microbiology		
Natural Science	Molecular and Cellular Biology	Roy Philip Forster	Dartmouth College	Kidney function	Also won in 1948	
Natural Science	Molecular and Cellular Biology	William Zev Hassid	University of California, Berkeley	Structure of naturally-occurring carbohydrates	Also won in 1962	
Natural Science	Molecular and Cellular Biology	Robert W. Holley	Cornell University			
Natural Science	Molecular and Cellular Biology	Lloyd L. Ingraham	US Department of Agriculture	Mechanism by which thiamine catalyses the "in vitro" decarboxylation of pyruvic acid		
Natural Science	Molecular and Cellular Biology	Joseph Logan Irvin	University of North Carolina School of Medicine	Biosynthesis and the heterogeneity of the desoxypentose nucleoproteins of various normal tissues and of certain tumors		
Natural Science	Molecular and Cellular Biology	Nicholas Nicolaides			Also won in 1956	
Natural Science	Molecular and Cellular Biology	Man Chiang Niu	Stanford University	Embryonic differentiation	Also won in 1954	
Natural Science	Molecular and Cellular Biology	Daniel J. O'Kane	University of Pennsylvania	Interrelationship of nutrition		
Natural Science	Molecular and Cellular Biology	John Thomas Reid	Cornell University			
Natural Science	Molecular and Cellular Biology	Mark A. Stahmann	University of Wisconsin			
Natural Science	Molecular and Cellular Biology	Henry Burr Steinbach	University of Minnesota	Use of radioactive tracers, the mechanisms of sodium transport, and potassium uptake by isolated frog sartorius muscles and other tissues		
Natural Science	Molecular and Cellular Biology	Gordon Brims Black McIvor Sutherland	University of Michigan	Structure of proteins and nucleic acides by infrared analysis		
Natural Science	Neuroscience	Ronald Grant	Stanford University	Hypothalamus in physical and psychological responses to stress		
Natural Science	Neuroscience	Stephen William Kuffler	Johns Hopkins Medical School	Neurophysiology of synaptic excitation and inhibition in nerve cells and at nerve muscle junctions		
Natural Science	Organismic Biology and Ecology	Charles Mitchill Bogert		Reptilian thermal biology and amphibian vocalization		
Natural Science	Organismic Biology and Ecology	Robert Kyle Burns	Carnegie Institution	Sex differentiation in the embryo		
Natural Science	Organismic Biology and Ecology	Rada Dyson-Hudson				
Natural Science	Organismic Biology and Ecology	Gerhard Fankhauser	Princeton University	Heteroploidy in animals		
Natural Science	Organismic Biology and Ecology	Herbert Friedmann			Also won in 1950 and 1953	
Natural Science	Organismic Biology and Ecology	Aubrey Gorbman				
Natural Science	Organismic Biology and Ecology	Judson Linsley Gressitt	Bishop Museum	Field studies in New Guinea and the Bismarck Archipelago		
Natural Science	Organismic Biology and Ecology	Benjamin Vincent Hall	University of Illinois	Minute functional anatomy of the renal glomerulus		
Natural Science	Organismic Biology and Ecology	Sol Kramer	New York University			
Natural Science	Organismic Biology and Ecology	Ernest Albert Lachner	National Museum of Natural History	Tropical marine fishes	Also won in 1959	
Natural Science	Organismic Biology and Ecology	Victor C. Twitty				
Natural Science	Organismic Biology and Ecology	Sylvan Meryl Rose				
Natural Science	Organismic Biology and Ecology	Lloyd Eugene Rozeboom	Johns Hopkins University	Transmission of viruses by mosquitos		
Natural Science	Organismic Biology and Ecology	Carroll M. Williams	Harvard University			
Natural Science	Organismic Biology and Ecology	Mildred Stratton Wilson				
Natural Science	Physics	Herbert L. Anderson	University of Chicago			
Natural Science	Physics	Peter Axel	University of Illinois	Interaction between gamma rays and nuclei to test the validity of various proposed models of the nucleus		
Natural Science	Physics	Calvin M. Class	Rice Institute			
Natural Science	Physics	Arthur H. Compton	Washington University in St. Louis	Development of the atomic bomb, uses of atomic energy, and work in the field of natural philosophy	Also won in 1926 and 1959	
Natural Science	Physics	Giuseppe Cocconi	Cornell University			
Natural Science	Physics	Burton Lehman Henke	Pomona College	Application of submicroscopic structure analysis by ultra-soft x-ray diffraction to problems of medicine, biology, and chemistry		
Natural Science	Physics	Clyde A. Hutchison, Jr.	University of Chicago		Also won in 1972	
Natural Science	Physics	Norman Myles Kroll	Columbia University			
Natural Science	Physics	Robert Briggs Leachman	Los Alamos Scientific Laboratory	Validity of the models of complex nuclei		
Natural Science	Physics	Arnold Nordsieck	University of Illinois	Quantum electrodynamics with emphasis on the nonlinear aspects of the present theory and possible nonlinear modifications of it		
Natural Science	Physics	George Thomas Reynolds	Princeton University	Hyperons and heavy mesons of cosmic rays		
Natural Science	Physics	George Placzek	Institute for Advanced Study	Statistical mechanics and the interaction of neutrons with matter		
Natural Science	Physics	Raymond Sheline	Florida State University	Decay schemes and associated spectra of selected nuclear species from the viewpoint of the nuclear model of Aage Bohr	Also won in 1956 and 1964	
Natural Science	Physics	Theodore Soller	Amherst College			
Natural Science	Physics	Robert Dean Spence	Michigan State College	Imperfections and phase transitions in solids, by radio frequency techniques		
Natural Science	Physics	Charles Hard Townes				
Natural Science	Physics	Edwin Albrecht Uehling	University of Washington	Research at Harvard University		
Natural Science	Physics	Robert Lee Walker	California Institute of Technology			
Natural Science	Physics	Joseph Weber	University of Maryland	Quantum field theory	Also won in 1962	
Natural Science	Physics	Francis Dudley Williams	Ohio State University			
Natural Science	Plant Science	John Grieve Bald	University of California, Los Angeles		Also won in 1963	
Natural Science	Plant Science	Robert Theodore Clausen	Cornell University			
Natural Science	Plant Science	Frank Edwin Egler				
Natural Science	Plant Science	Wilbert Keith Kennedy	Cornell University			
Natural Science	Plant Science	Gleb Krotkov	Queen's University at Kingston	Aspects of the Canadian climate responsible for characteristics of Canadian wheat		
Natural Science	Plant Science	James Kucyniak	Montreal Botanical Garden	Bryophyte flora of the Gaspe Peninsula		
Natural Science	Plant Science	Louis Kimball Mann	University of California, Davis	Old World species of allium and their affinities		
Natural Science	Plant Science	Charles Duncan Michener	University of Kansas	South American bee fauna	Also won in 1966	
Natural Science	Plant Science	Harold E. Moore	Cornell University		Also won in 1946	
Natural Science	Plant Science	M. Rosalind Morris	University of Nebraska	Use of various types of irradiation for inducing beneficial mutations in crop plants		
Natural Science	Plant Science	Harry H. Murakishi	Hawaii Agricultural Experiment Station	Differentiation and classification of orchid viruses and virus diseases of orchids		
Natural Science	Plant Science	Lindsay Shepherd Olive	Columbia University	Jelly fungi of the Society Islands		
Natural Science	Plant Science	William Jacob Robbins				
Natural Science	Plant Science	Rudolf M. Schuster	Duke University	Ecology and taxonomy of the hepaticae of Eastern North America	Also won in 1967	
Natural Science	Plant Science	Sanford Marvin Siegel	University of Tampa	Metabolism of lignin and other aromatic substances		
Natural Science	Plant Science	John Maurice Tucker	University of California, Davis	Evolution of oaks		
Natural Science	Statistics	Erich L. Lehmann	University of California, Berkeley	Multiple decision procedures	Also won in 1966 and 1979	
Social Sciences	Anthropology and Cultural Studies	Arthur J. O. Anderson	Museum of New Mexico	Translation of the Aztec version of Bernardino de Sahagún's Historia General de Las Cosas de Nueva España	Also won in 1957	
Social Sciences	Anthropology and Cultural Studies	David Crockett Graham		Religions of the peoples of west China	Also won in 1952	
Social Sciences	Anthropology and Cultural Studies	Katharine Luomala	University of Hawaii	Polynesian mythology	Also won in 1959	
Social Sciences	Anthropology and Cultural Studies	Edward H. Spicer	University of Arizona	Cultural history of the Mexican-American southwest	Also won in 1941	
Social Sciences	Economics	Stephen Enke	Rand Corporation			
Social Sciences	Economics	John Kenneth Galbraith	Harvard University			
Social Sciences	Economics	Carl Kaysen	Harvard University			
Social Sciences	Economics	John Marion Letiche	University of California, Berkeley	History of economic thought, from mercantilism to laissez-faire		
Social Sciences	Economics	Edith Tilton Penrose	Johns Hopkins University	Growth of industrial firms in Australia		
Social Sciences	Economics	Warren Candler Scoville	University of California, Los Angeles		Also won in 1948	
Social Sciences	Economics	Arthur Smithies				
Social Sciences	Economics	William Spencer Vickrey				
Social Sciences	Economics	Arthur N. Young				
Social Sciences	Law	Philip B. Kurland			Also won in 1949	
Social Sciences	Law	Clyde Wilson Summers	University of Buffalo	Legal rights of employees in Swedish labor unions		
Social Sciences	Political Science	Douglass Cater, Jr.	The Reporter			
Social Sciences	Political Science	John Hamilton Hallowell	Duke University	Political and social philosophy of the Christian Democratic Union of Germany		
Social Sciences	Political Science	John D. Montgomery	Babson Institute			
Social Sciences	Political Science	David B. Truman	Columbia University			
Social Sciences	Political Science	Eric Herman Wilhelm Voegelin	Louisiana State University		Also won in 1950	
Social Sciences	Psychology	Jerome Seymour Bruner	Harvard University			
Social Sciences	Psychology	Jean Evans			Also won in 1950	
Social Sciences	Psychology	John Langworthy Fuller	Jackson Memorial Laboratory			
Social Sciences	Psychology	A. Arthur Schiller	Columbia University	Development of the law of Rome into the law of the Roman Empire, 117-235 AD	Also won in 1949 and 1962	
Social Sciences	Sociology	Jean Robertson Burnet	University of Toronto	Puritanism in Ontario		
Social Sciences	Sociology	Robert Francis Winch	Northwestern University	Formation of social groups	Also won in 1974	

== 1955 Latin American and Caribbean Fellows ==
Category	Field of Study	Fellow	Institutional association	Research topic	Notes	Ref
Creative Arts	Fiction	Samuel Selvon			Also won in 1968	
Humanities	Iberian and Latin American History	Isabel Gutiérrez del Arroyo				
Humanities	Literary Criticism	Edilberto K. Tiempo		Doctoral studies at University of Denver		
Natural Sciences	Astronomy and Astrophysics	Rüdiger Jaschek				
Natural Sciences	Astronomy and Astrophysics	Jorge Sahade			Also won in 1953	
Natural Sciences	Chemistry	Manuel García Morín			Also won in 1954	
Natural Sciences	Earth Science	Arturo Alcaraz		Research at University of California at Berkeley		
Natural Sciences	Earth Science	Alfredo de la Torre y Callejas			Also won in 1956	
Natural Sciences	Earth Science	Nicolas L. Galvez				
Natural Sciences	Molecular and Cellular Biology	Alberto Cazorla Talleri				
Natural Sciences	Molecular and Cellular Biology	Norberto José Palleroni	Universidad Nacional de Cuyo		Also won in 1953 and 1954	
Natural Sciences	Molecular and Cellular Biology	José Ramírez de Arellano			Also won in 1956	
Natural Sciences	Organismic Biology and Ecology	Jorge de Alba Martinez				
Natural Sciences	Organismic Biology and Ecology	J. Enrique Avila Laguna			Also won in 1956	
Natural Sciences	Organismic Biology and Ecology	Margarita Bravo Hollis				
Natural Sciences	Organismic Biology and Ecology	Paulo Emilio Vanzolini			Also won in 1949 and 1958	
Natural Sciences	Plant Science	Alvaro Santos Costa				
Natural Sciences	Plant Science	Fausto Folquer			Also won in 1957	
Natural Sciences	Plant Science	Gustavo Huertas González			Also won in 1954	
Natural Sciences	Plant Science	Edgardo Raúl Montaldi			Also won in 1957	
Natural Sciences	Plant Science	Victor Manuel Patiño Rodríguez		History of useful plants in Equatorial America	Also won in 1956 and 1965	
Natural Sciences	Plant Science	Alcides Ribeiro Teixeira				
Natural Sciences	Plant Science	Jorge A. Soria Vasco			Also won in 1957	
Natural Sciences	Plant Science	Alfonso Trejos Willis		Doctoral studies at Duke University	Also won in 1954	
Natural Sciences	Plant Science	Jorge Helios Morello Wyler			Also won in 1954 and 1958	
Social Sciences	Psychology	Mariano Dy-Liacco Obias				
Social Sciences	Sociology	Segundo Bernal				

== See also ==
- Guggenheim Fellowship
- List of Guggenheim Fellowships awarded in 1954
- List of Guggenheim Fellowships awarded in 1956
