= Dempster =

Dempster may refer to:

== People ==
- Dempster (surname), a surname
- Dempster Woodworth, Wisconsin state senator and physician
- Dempster (deemster), an official at pre-1746 baronial courts' moot hills in Scotland.

== Places ==
- Dempster, South Dakota
- Dempster Land District, Western Australia
- Dempster Highway, a Canadian roadway, in the Yukon and Northwest Territories
- Dempster Street, a major east–west artery north of Chicago, Illinois, part of which is part of U.S. Route 14
  - Dempster (CTA Purple Line station), a Chicago Transit Authority rapid transit station in Evanston, Illinois
  - Dempster-Skokie (CTA station), a Chicago Transit Authority rapid transit station in Skokie, Illinois
  - Dempster Street station (C&NW), a former commuter rail station in Evanston, Illinois

== Companies and products ==
- Dempster Brothers, Inc., a Tennessee industrial firm
  - Dempster Dumpmaster, a garbage-handling vehicle manufactured by the company
  - Dempster Dumpster, a waste receptacle manufactured by the company
- Dempster's brand bread, a product of Canada Bread
- Dempsters, a manufacturing company in Nebraska
