= Schoolfield =

Schoolfield may refer to:

== People ==
- George C. Schoolfield (1925–2016), American professor
- Kent Schoolfield (born 1946), American football player

== Places ==
- Schoolfield, Virginia, previous name for Danville, Virginia
