= Arturo Alcaraz =

Filipino volcanologist

- Born: Arturo Pineda Alcaraz; March 21, 1916; Manila, Philippine Islands
- Died: March 10, 2001 (aged 84)
- Education: University of the Philippines Manila Mapúa Institute of Technology (BS, 1937); University of Wisconsin–Madison (MS, 1941)
- Awards: Ramon Magsaysay Award for Government Service (1982)
- Scientific career
- Fields: Volcanology, Seismology, & Geology
- Workplaces: Bureau of Mines; Philippine Weather Bureau; Philippine Commission on Volcanology; National Power Corporation

Arturo Pineda Alcaraz (March 21, 1916 – March 10, 2001) was a Filipino volcanologist known for his work on geothermal energy. He received the 1982 Ramon Magsaysay Award for Government Service.

== Early life and education ==
Arturo Pineda Alcaraz was born on March 21, 1916, to Conrado Alcaraz and Paz Pineda in Manila. Due to his father's occupation as a government auditor, the Alacaraz family moved often. He completed his elementary school education in Lucena, Quezon and had his high school education in Camarines Norte and Baguio.

His father's cousin, Leopoldo Faustino, who was then Head of the Division of Mines of the Bureau of Science, inspired Alcaraz to pursue a career in mining. In 1933, he enrolled in the College of Engineering of the University of the Philippines Manila since no university in the country offered a mining-related degree at that time. However, a year later the Mapúa Institute of Technology offered a degree in mining engineering where Alcaraz transferred to and received his Bachelor of Science degree in 1937. After graduating, he joined the Bureau of Mines.

He then received his M.S. in Geology from the University of Wisconsin–Madison in 1941 through a government scholarship. On his way back to the Philippines, Alcaraz boarded a Japanese ship in San Francisco. While the ship was crossing the Pacific Ocean, the United States government froze all Japanese assets. As a result, Alcaraz and the other returning Filipino scholars were stranded in Tokyo after the ship failed to continue to the Philippines, which was a territory of the United States at that time. Assisted by the American Embassy, they were able to return to Manila by the end of August 1941.

In 1948, Alcaraz received a grant from the United States Government under the postwar Rehabilitation Act to study microseismology at the Opa-locka Naval Air Station in Florida. In 1955, he was awarded a Guggenheim Fellowship and received a Certificate in Volcanology from the University of California, Berkeley. He was also awarded a Colombo Plan Fellowship and took a three-month training course on geothermal energy at Kyushu University in Fukuoka, Japan.

== Career ==
After graduating in 1937, Alcaraz joined the Bureau of Mines as an aide in the geology division. A year later, he went to the United States to study for his master's degree. Upon his return in 1941, the Bureau of Mines assigned him to Busuanga Island, Palawan to study manganese deposits.

After the Japanese victory at Corregidor in May 1942, Alcaraz returned to Manila to visit his family. He learned that the Japanese occupation government had reduced the Bureau of Mines into a skeleton crew of which he was not a part of. In 1943, Maximo Lachica, the Director of the Philippine Weather Bureau, offered him the post of Chief Geophysicist. Alcaraz had met Lachica on the ship from San Francisco.

After the Allied victory in the Battle of Manila, Alcaraz took leave from the Weather Bureau and did a few months of volunteer work as a civilian engineer for the U.S. Army and surveyed the Port Area for clearing and rebuilding. After the end of World War II, he remained as the Chief Geophysicist of the Weather Bureau.

In 1947, Alcaraz studied the eruption of the Mayon Volcano. Since he did not have a personal vehicle, he travelled around the base of the volcano on public buses. He also met with municipal officials and discussed contingency plans for the local population.

In December 1951, Mount Hibok-Hibok in Camiguin released a nuée ardente (burning cloud of hot ash and gas) which resulted in 600 deaths. As a result, the Commission on Volcanology (ComVol) was officially created under the National Research Council. Alcaraz was appointed Chief Volcanologist, a post which he held until 1974. During his tenure as Chief Volcanologist, the ComVol monitored the 1965, 1966, 1967, 1968 and 1969 eruptions of the Taal Volcano, and the 1968 eruption of the Mayon Volcano.

== See also ==
- List of Magsaysay awardees
- List of Guggenheim Fellowships awarded in 1955
