= Rosalind Morris =

American geneticist (1920–2022)

Mary Rosalind Morris (May 8, 1920 – March 26, 2022) was a professor of plant cytogenetics at the University of Nebraska–Lincoln from 1947 to 1990. She was one of the first women to earn a doctoral degree in genetics and plant breeding from Cornell University, was the first female faculty member in the Department of Agronomy and Horticulture at UNL, and was the first woman fellow of the American Society of Agronomy. Her pioneering work on "misbehaving chromosomes" in wheat cytogenetics was internationally recognized. In 1980, she served as president of the Nebraska Academy of Sciences. She was awarded a fellowship with the American Association for the Advancement of Science and a Guggenheim Fellowship. She was born in Wales and immigrated with her family to Forest, Ontario, Canada as a child. She died on March 26, just before her 102nd birthday. She is buried in Beechwood Cemetery in Forest.

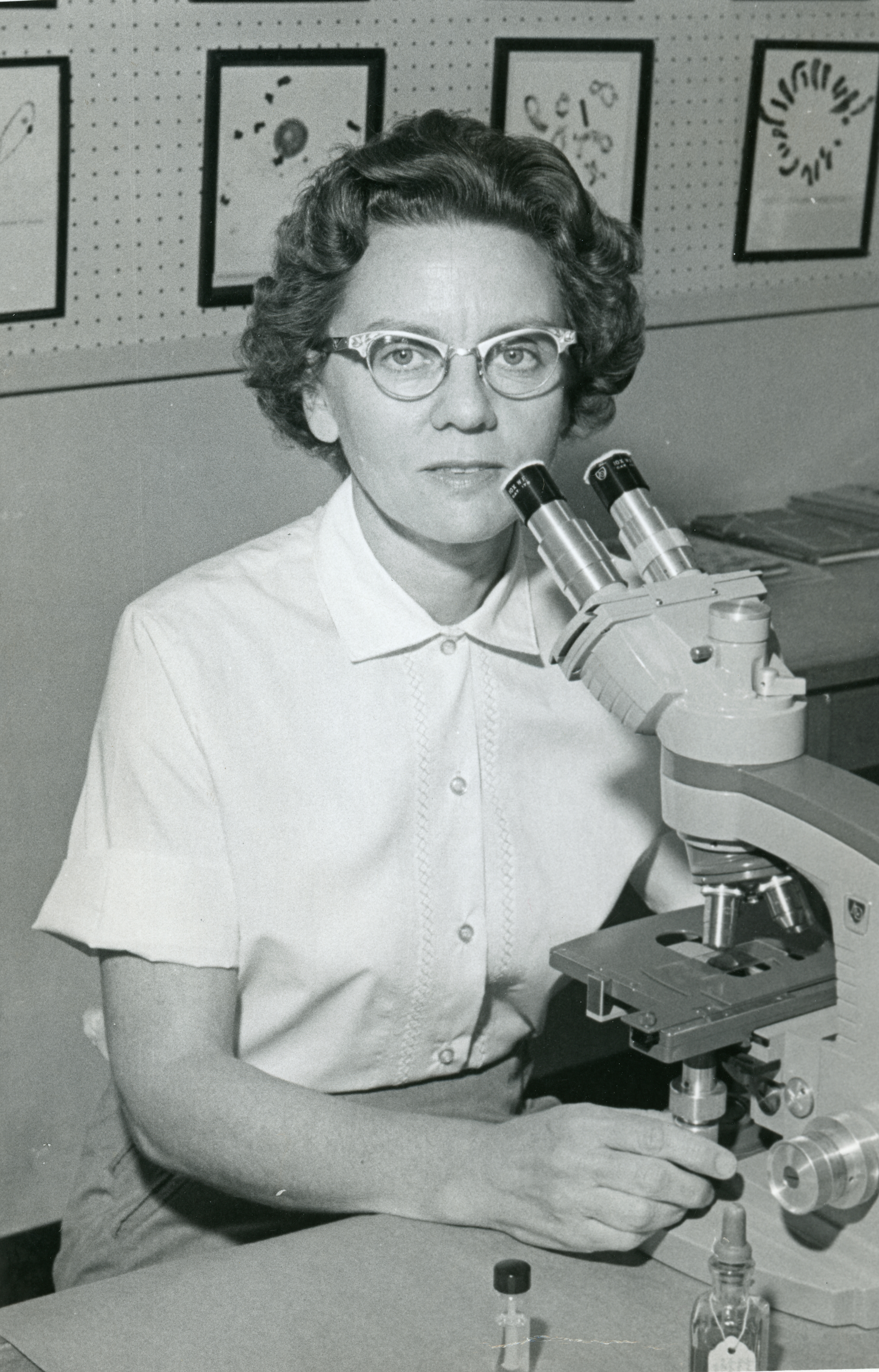
M. Rosalind Morris, trailblazing former professor emeritus of plant cytogenetics at the University of Nebraska–Lincoln.

== Selected publications ==
- Morris, Rosalind; ------ (1967). "The cytogenetics of wheat and its relatives." In K.S. Quisenberry; L.P. Reitz (eds). Wheat and Wheat Improvement. Madison, Wisconsin: American Society of Agronomy. pp. 19–87.
