= Dempster (surname) =

Dempster is a surname. Notable people with the surname include:

- Arthur Jeffrey Dempster (1886–1950), Canadian-American physicist who discovered the ^{235}U uranium isotope
- Arthur P. Dempster (1929–2026), American mathematical statistician and academic
- Barry Dempster (1952–2025), Canadian poet, novelist and editor
- Carol Dempster, American actress
- Charles Edward Dempster (1839–1907), Western Australian politician
- Charlotte Louisa Hawkins Dempster (1835–1913), British writer and folklorist
- Dallas Dempster, Australian businessman
- Edith Pretty (née Dempster) (1883–1942), English landowner who donated the Sutton Hoo treasure
- Edward Dempster (fl. 1667–1669), buccaneer who raided the Spanish alongside Henry Morgan
- Eric Dempster, New Zealand cricketer
- Everett Dempster, American geneticist
- George Dempster (lawyer), Scottish lawyer and MP
- George Roby Dempster, U.S. businessman and politician, founder of Dempster Brothers, Inc.
- Graham Dempster, Australian rules football player
- Hugh Dempster, British actor
- Jocky Dempster, Scottish footballer
- John Dempster (Medal of Honor), American Civil War sailor
- John Dempster (footballer), English footballer
- Leeann Dempster, chief executive of Hibernian F.C.
- Mary Dempster (born 1955), Canadian volleyball player
- Nigel Dempster, British journalist, author and broadcaster
- Quentin Dempster, Australian journalist
- Rebecca Dempster (born 1991), Scottish footballer
- Roland T. Dempster, Liberian writer
- Ryan Dempster, Canadian-born American baseball player
- Sean Dempster, Australian rules football player
- Stephen Dempster, Canadian religious scholar
- Stewie Dempster, New Zealand cricketer
- Stuart Dempster, American musician
- Thomas Dempster, Scottish scholar and historian
- Walter Dempster, Philippine drag queen and World War II sex slave
