= Thomas F. Anderson =

American biophysical chemist and geneticist

- Born: February 7, 1911; Manitowoc, Wisconsin, United States
- Died: August 11, 1991 (aged 80); Philadelphia, Pennsylvania, United States
- Education: California Institute of Technology
- Known for: Development of techniques for the electron microscope
- Spouse: Wilma Fay Ecton (m. 1937–1991)
- Children: Jessie Dale Anderson & Thomas F. Anderson Jr
- Awards: Pasteur Institute's Silver Medal (1957)
- Scientific career
- Fields: Biophysical chemistry & genetics
- Institutions: University of Pennsylvania (1942–1977)

Thomas Foxen Anderson (February 7, 1911 – August 11, 1991) was an American biophysical chemist and geneticist who developed crucial techniques for using electron microscopes. Anderson pioneered use of the electron microscope to study viruses. His research produced insights of how viruses infect cells, methods of their reproduction and how they alter the cells they infect.

Anderson was elected as the president of the Electron Microscope Society of America in 1955, and to the National Academy of Sciences in 1964. Anderson was president of the International Federation of Electron Microscope Societies, president of the Biophysical Society, chairman of the United States National Committee of the International Union for Pure and Applied Biophysics, and chairman of the Genetics Section of the National Academy of Sciences.

== Life ==
Anderson was born in 1911 in Manitowoc, Wisconsin, to Anton Oliver Anderson, an electrical engineer, and Mabel Foxen, both the children of Norwegian immigrants. When he was a child, his brother, Norman, developed a chronic mastoiditis. After the death of his mother in 1920, Anton married a new wife, Edna Halvorsen, and began moving his family in 1923, in search of a better climate for the health of his sick son. They lived successively in four different locations: Tampa, Florida (1923-1924); Amherst, Wisconsin, (1924-1925); Rockford, Illinois (1925-1926); and Glendale, California, which is where they finally settled.

Anderson enrolled the California Institute of Technology for his higher studies, from which he received his bachelor's degree and doctorate in 1932 and 1936, respectively. He married Wilma Fay Ecton on December 28, 1937. He joined the faculty of the University of Pennsylvania in 1942, where he was named a professor of biology in 1958. He left the university in 1977 when he became director of the Fox Chase Cancer Center's postdoctoral training program for basic research. He retired in 1983.

A resident of Fox Chase, Pennsylvania, Anderson died on August 11, 1991, at Jeanes Hospital in Philadelphia, Pennsylvania, following a series of strokes. He was interred in Oak Grove Cemetery in Amherst, Wisconsin.

== Awards ==
- Guggenheim Fellowship, 1955
- National Academy of Sciences, 1964
- Distinguished Award of the Electron Microscope Society of America in 1978
- The Pasteur Institute's silver medal in 1957
