= Bernardino de Sahagún =

16th-century Franciscan friar and missionary in colonial Mexico

The Reverend Bernardino de Sahagún OFM
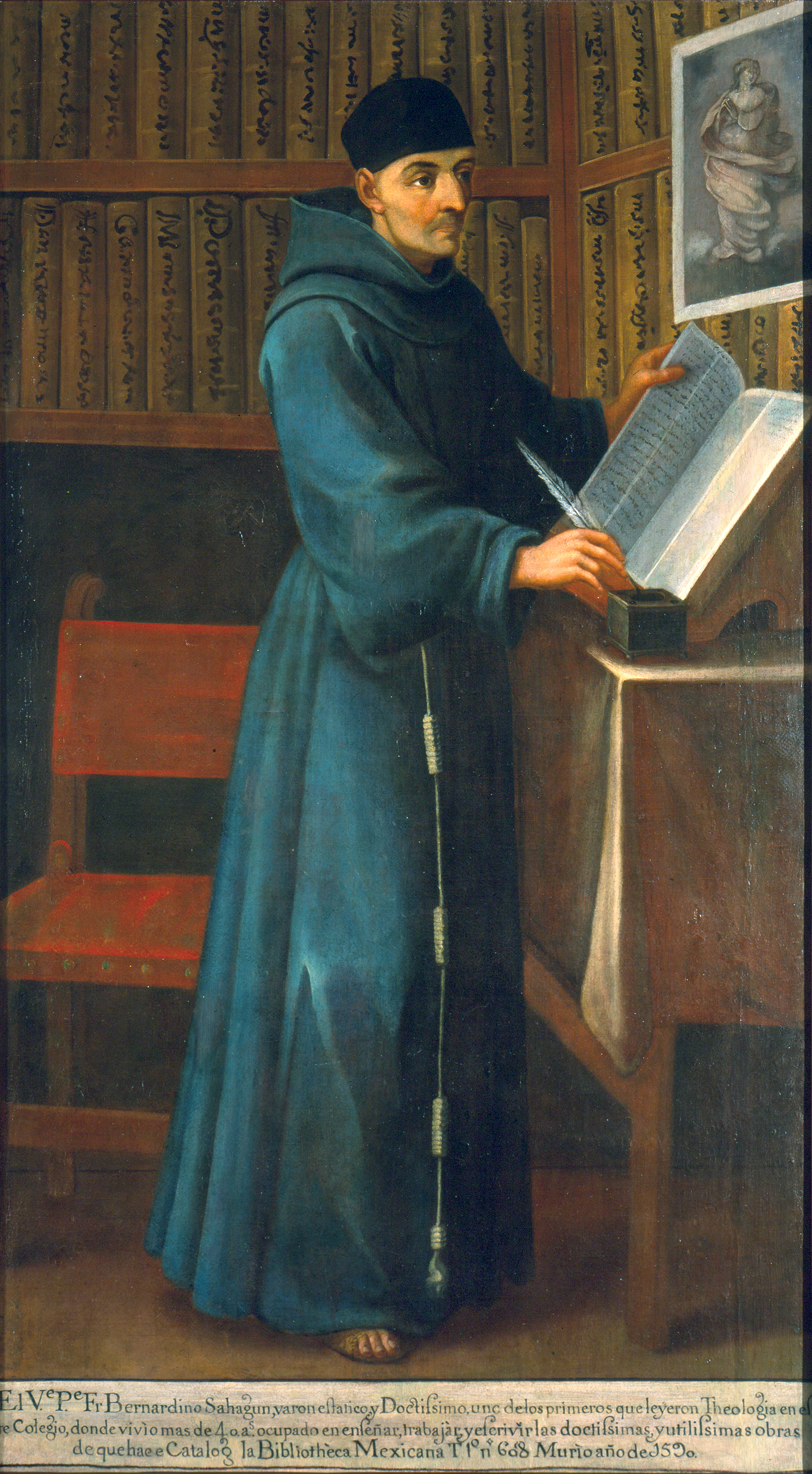
- 17th-century portrait of Sahagún
- Pronunciation: Spanish: [beɾnaɾˈðino ðe saaˈɣun]
- Born: Bernardino de Ribeira c. 1499; Sahagún, Crown of Castile (today in Province of León, Castile and Leon, Spain)
- Died: 5 February 1590 (aged 90–91); Tlatelolco, New Spain (today in Mexico City, Mexico)
- Occupation: Franciscan missionary

Signature
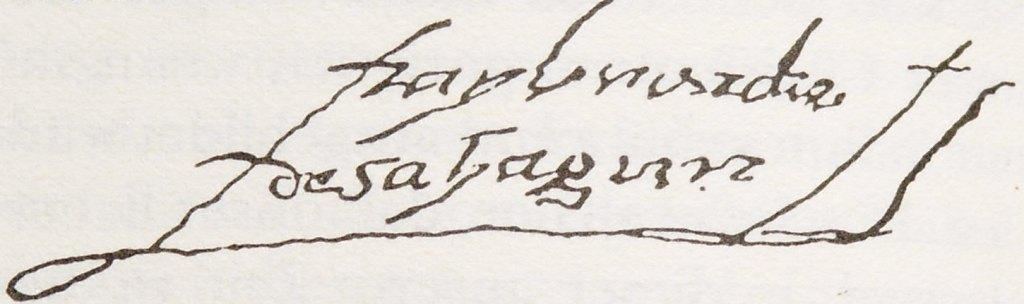

Bernardino de Sahagún OFM (c. 1499 – 5 February 1590) was a Franciscan friar, missionary priest and pioneering ethnographer who participated in the Catholic evangelization of colonial New Spain (now Mexico). Born in Sahagún, Spain, in 1499, he journeyed to New Spain in 1529. He learned Nahuatl and spent more than 50 years in the study of Aztec beliefs, culture and history. Though he was primarily devoted to his missionary task, his extraordinary work documenting indigenous worldview and culture has earned him the title as "The First Anthropologist." He also contributed to the description of Nahuatl, the imperial language of the Aztec Empire. He translated the Psalms, the Gospels, and a catechism into Nahuatl.

Sahagún is perhaps best known as the compiler of the Historia general de las cosas de la Nueva España—in English, General History of the Things of New Spain—(hereinafter referred to as Historia general). The most famous extant manuscript of the Historia general is the Florentine Codex. It is a codex consisting of 2,400 pages organized into twelve books, with approximately 2,500 illustrations drawn by native artists using both native and European techniques. The alphabetic text is bilingual in Spanish and Nahuatl on opposing folios, and the pictorials should be considered a third kind of text. It documents the culture, religious cosmology (worldview), ritual practices, society, economics, and history of the Aztec people, and in Book 12 gives an account of the conquest of the Aztec Empire from the Tenochtitlan-Tlatelolco point of view. In the process of putting together the Historia general, Sahagún pioneered new methods for gathering ethnographic information and validating its accuracy. The Historia general has been called "one of the most remarkable accounts of a non-Western culture ever composed," and Sahagún has been called the father of American ethnography. In 2015, his work was declared a World Heritage by the UNESCO.

== Education in Spain ==
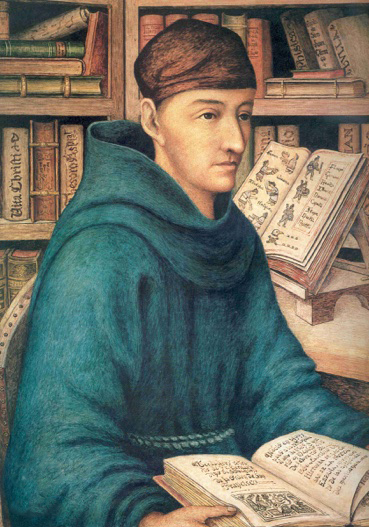
Fray Bernardino de Sahagún

Fray Bernardino was born Bernardino de Rivera (Ribera, Ribeira) 1499 in Sahagún, Spain. He attended the University of Salamanca, where he was exposed to the currents of Renaissance humanism. During this period, the university at Salamanca was strongly influenced by Erasmus, and was a center for Spanish Franciscan intellectual life. It was there that he joined the Order of Friars Minor or Franciscans. He was probably ordained around 1527. Entering the order he followed the Franciscan custom of changing his family name for the name of his birth town, becoming Bernardino de Sahagún.

Spanish conquistadores led by Hernán Cortés conquered the Aztec capital of Tenochtitlan (on the site of present-day Mexico City) in 1521, and Franciscan missionaries followed shortly thereafter in 1524. Sahagún was not in this first group of twelve friars, which arrived in New Spain in 1524. An account, in both Spanish and Nahuatl, of the disputation that these Franciscan friars held in Tenochtitlan soon after their arrival was made by Sahagún in 1564, in order to provide a model for future missionaries. Thanks to his own academic and religious reputation, Sahagún was recruited in 1529 to join the missionary effort in New Spain. He would spend the next 61 years there.

== Evangelization of New Spain ==
Evangeliario en lengua mexicana: "Catecism in Mexican language" (Nahuatl)

During the Age of Discovery, 1450–1700, Iberian rulers took a great interest in the missionary evangelization of indigenous peoples encountered in newly discovered lands. In Catholic Spain and Portugal, the missionary project was funded by Catholic monarchs under the patronato real issued by the pope to ensure Catholic missionary work was part of a broader project of conquest and colonization.

The decades after the Spanish conquest witnessed a dramatic transformation of indigenous culture, a transformation with a religious dimension that contributed to the creation of Mexican culture. People from both the Spanish and indigenous cultures held a wide range of opinions and views about what was happening in this transformation.

The evangelization of New Spain was led by Franciscan, Dominican and Augustinian friars. These religious orders established the Catholic Church in colonial New Spain, and directed it during most of the 16th century. The Franciscans in particular were enthusiastic about the new land and its people.

Franciscan friars who went to the New World were motivated by a desire to preach the Gospel to new peoples. Many Franciscans were convinced that there was great religious meaning in the discovery and evangelization of these new peoples. They were astonished that such new peoples existed and believed that preaching to them would bring about the return of Christ and the end of time, a set of beliefs called millenarianism. Concurrently, many of the friars were discontented with the corruption of European society, including, at times, the leadership of the Catholic Church. They believed that New Spain was the opportunity to revive the pure spirit of primitive Christianity. During the first decades of the Spanish conquest of Mesoamerica, many indigenous people converted to Christianity, at least superficially.

The friars employed a large number of indigenous Americans for the construction of churches and monasteries, not only for the construction itself, but also as artists, painters and sculptors, and their works were used for decoration and evangelization. In this process, the native artists added many references to their customs and beliefs: flowers, birds or geometric symbols. Friars thought the images were decorative, but the Natives recognized their strong religious connotation. The mixture of Christian and Indian symbols has been described as Indocristiano or Indochristian art. Inspired by their Franciscan spirituality and Catholic humanism, the friars organized the indigenous peoples into utopian communities. There were massive waves of indigenous peoples converting to Catholicism, as measured by hundreds of thousands of baptisms in massive evangelization centers set up by the friars.

In its initial stages, the colonial evangelization project appeared quite successful, despite the sometimes antagonizing behavior of the conquistadores. However, the indigenous people did not express their Christian faith in the ways expected by the missionary friars. Many still practiced their pre-European contact religious rituals and maintained their ancestral beliefs, much as they had for hundreds or thousands of years, while also participating in Catholic worship, a practice known as multiple religious belonging. The friars had disagreements over how best to approach this problem, as well as disagreements about their mission, and how to determine success.

== At the Colegio de Santa Cruz de Tlatelolco ==
Sahagún helped found the first European school of higher education in the Americas, the Colegio Imperial de Santa Cruz de Tlatelolco in 1536, in what is now Mexico City. This later served as a base for his own research activities, as he recruited former students to work with him. The college contributed to the blending of Spanish and indigenous cultures in what is now Mexico.

It became a vehicle for evangelization of students, as well as the recruiting and training of native men to the Catholic clergy; it was a center for the study of native languages, especially Nahuatl. The college contributed to the establishment of Catholic Christianity in New Spain and became an important institution for cultural exchange. Sahagún taught Latin and other subjects during its initial years. Other friars taught grammar, history, religion, scripture, and philosophy. Native leaders were recruited to teach about native history and traditions, leading to controversy among colonial officials who were concerned with controlling the indigenous populations. During this period, Franciscans who affirmed the full humanity and capacity of indigenous people were perceived as suspect by colonial officials and the Dominican Order. Some of the latter competitors hinted that the Friars were endorsing idolatry. The friars had to be careful in pursuing and defining their interactions with indigenous people.

Sahagún was one of several friars at the school who wrote notable accounts of indigenous life and culture. Two notable products of the scholarship at the college are the first New World "herbal," and a map of what is now the Mexico City region. An "herbal" is a catalog of plants and their uses, including descriptions and their medicinal applications. Such an herbal, the Libellus de Medicinalibus Indorum Herbis, was written in Latin by Juan Badianus de la Cruz, an Aztec teacher at the college, perhaps with help from students or other teachers. In this document, the plants are drawn, named and presented according to the Aztec system of organization. The text describes where the plants grow and how herbal medicines can be made from them. This "herbal" may have been used to teach indigenous medicine at the college. The Mapa de Santa Cruz shows the urban areas, networks of roads and canals, pictures of activities such as fishing and farming, and the broader landscape context. The herbal and the map show the influence of both the Spanish and the Aztec cultures, and by their structure and style convey the blending of these cultures.

== Work as a missionary ==
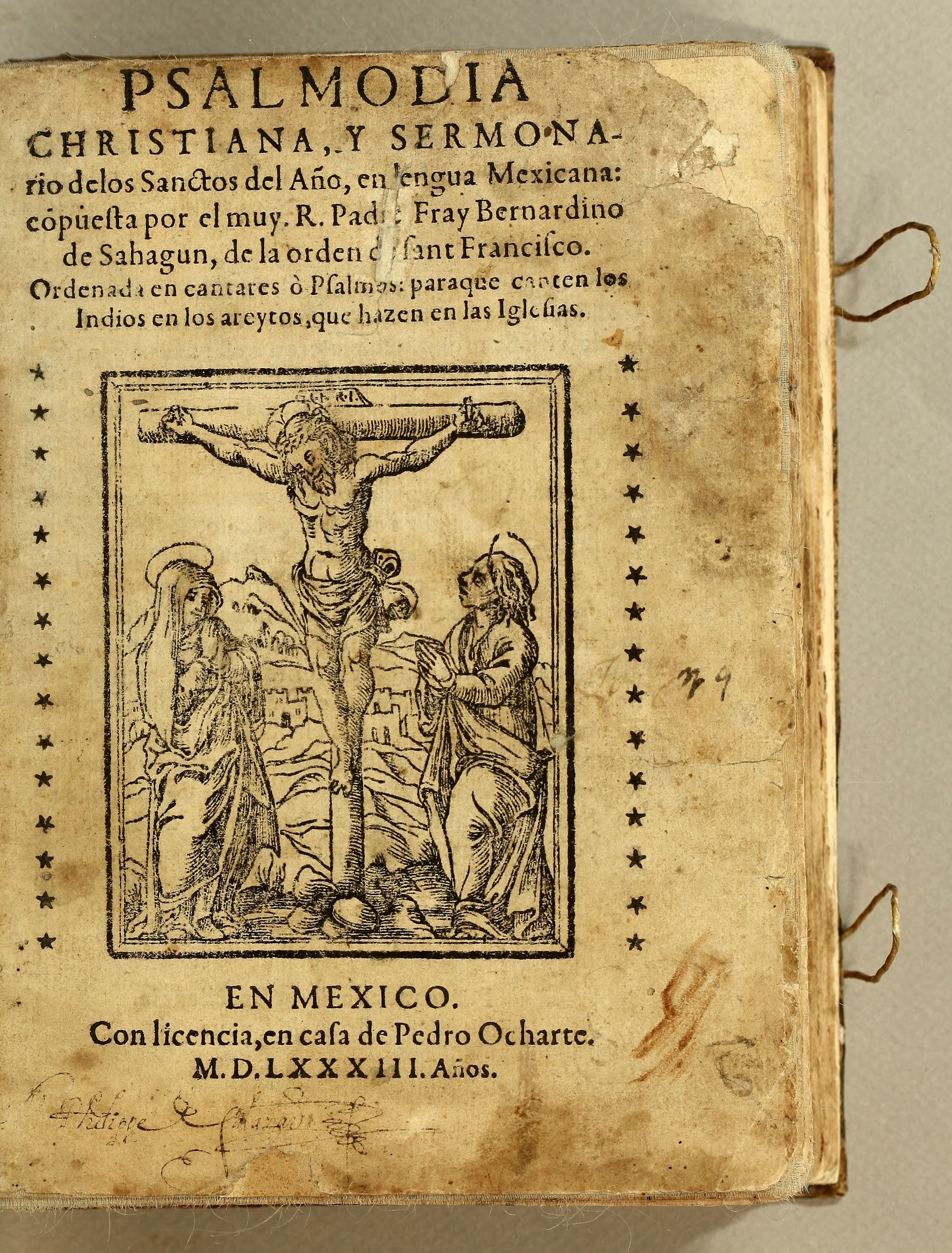
Title page, Psalmodia Christiana, 1583

In addition to teaching, Sahagún spent several extended periods outside of Mexico City, including in Tlalmanalco (1530–32); Xochimilco (1535), where he is known to have performed a marriage; Tepepulco (1559–61), Huexotzinco, and also evangelized, led religious services, and provided religious instruction. He was first and foremost a missionary, whose goal was to bring the peoples of the New World to the Catholic faith. He spent much time with the indigenous people in remote rural villages, as a Catholic priest, teacher, and missionary.

Sahagún was a gifted linguist, one of several Franciscans. As an Order, the Franciscans emphasized evangelization of the indigenous peoples in their own languages. Sahagún began his study of Nahuatl while traveling across the Atlantic, learning from indigenous nobles who were returning to the New World from Spain. Later he was recognized as one of the Spaniards most proficient in this language. Most of his writings reflect his Catholic missionary interests, and were designed to help churchmen preach in Nahuatl, or translate the Bible into Nahuatl, or provide religious instruction to indigenous peoples. Among his works in Nahuatl was a translation of the Psalms and a catechism. He likely composed his Psalmodia Christiana in Tepepolco when he was gathering material for the Primeros Memoriales. It was published in 1583 by Pedro Ocharte, but circulated in New Spain prior to that in order to replace with Christian texts the songs and poetry of the Nahuas. His curiosity drew him to learn more about the worldview of the Aztecs, and his linguistic skills enabled him to do so. Thus, Sahagún had the motivation, skills and disposition to study the people and their culture. He conducted field research in the indigenous language of Nahuatl. In 1547, he collected and recorded huehuetlatolli (Nahuatl: "Words of the old men"), Aztec formal orations given by elders for moral instruction, education of youth, and cultural construction of meaning. Between 1553 and 1555 he interviewed indigenous leaders in order to gain their perspective on the Spanish conquest of the Aztec Empire. In 1585 he wrote a revision of the conquest narrative, published as Book 12 of the Florentine Codex, one of his last works before his death in 1590.

== Field research ==
After the fervor of the early mass conversions in Mexico had subsided, Franciscan missionaries came to realize that they needed a better understanding of indigenous peoples in order effectively to pursue their work. Sahagún's life changed dramatically in 1558 when the new provincial of New Spain, Fray Francisco de Toral, commissioned him to write in Nahuatl about topics he considered useful for the missionary project. The provincial wanted Sahagún to formalize his study of native language and culture, so that he could share it with others. The priest had a free hand to conduct his investigations. He conducted research for about twenty-five years, and spent the last fifteen or so editing, translating and copying. His field research activities can be grouped into an earlier period (1558–1561) and a later period (1561–1575).

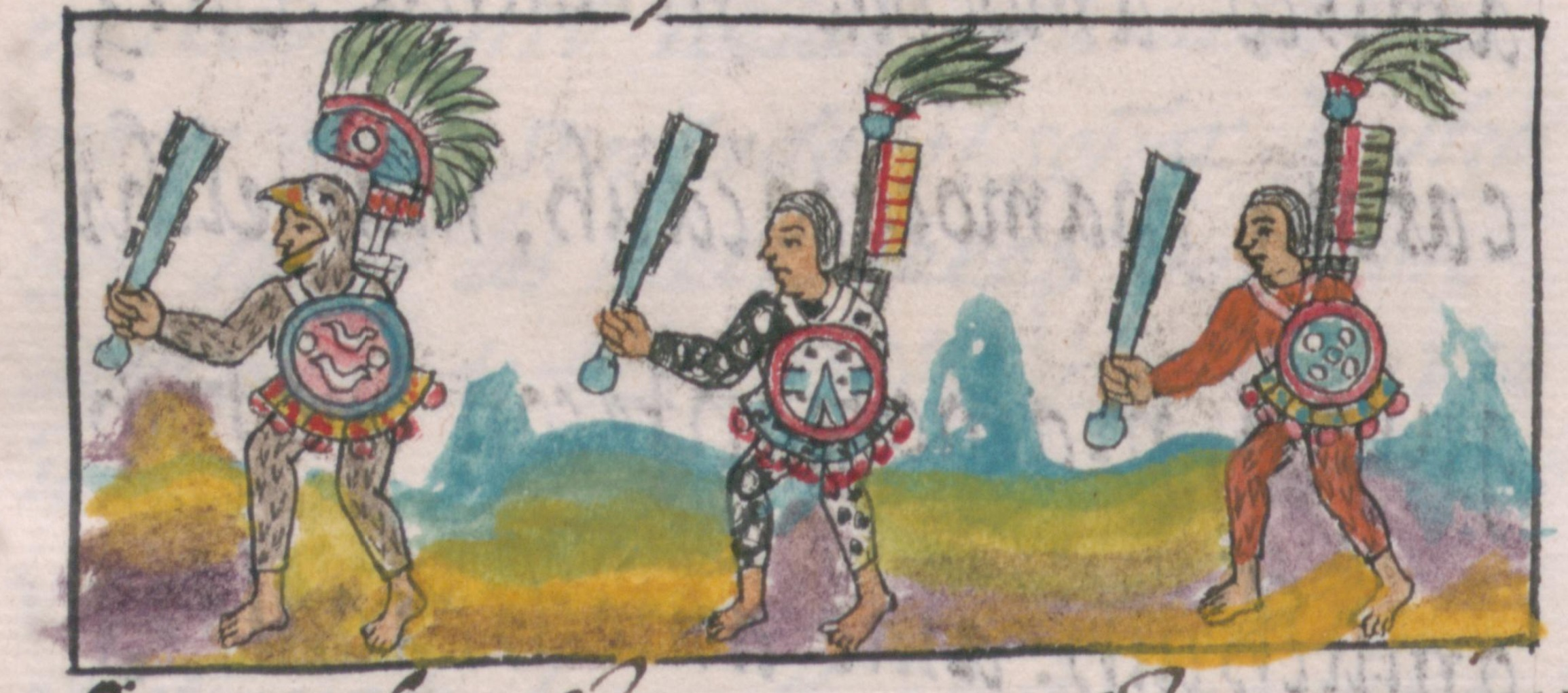
Aztec warriors as shown in the Florentine Codex

From his early research, Sahagún wrote the text known as Primeros Memoriales. This served as the basis for his subsequent, larger Historia general. He conducted his research at Tepeapulco, approximately 50 miles northeast of Mexico City, near present-day Hidalgo. There he spent two years interviewing approximately a dozen village elders in Nahuatl, assisted by native graduates of the college at Tlatelolco. Sahagún questioned the elders about the religious rituals and calendar, family, economic and political customs, and natural history. He interviewed them individually and in groups, and was thus able to evaluate the reliability of the information shared with him. His assistants spoke three languages (Nahuatl, Latin and Spanish). They participated in research and documentation, translation and interpretation, and they also painted illustrations. He published their names, described their work, and gave them credit. The pictures in the Primeros Memoriales convey a blend of indigenous and European artistic elements and influences. Analysis of Sahagún's research activities in this earlier period indicates that he was developing and evaluating his own methods for gathering and verifying this information.

During the period 1561–1575, Sahagún returned to Tlatelolco. He interviewed and consulted more elders and cultural authorities. He edited his prior work. He expanded the scope of his earlier research, and further developed his interviewing methods. He recast his project along the lines of the medieval encyclopedias. These were not encyclopedias in the contemporary sense, and can be better described as worldbooks, for they attempt to provide a relatively complete presentation of knowledge about the world.

== Methodologies ==
Sahagún was among the first to develop methods and strategies for gathering and validating knowledge of indigenous New World cultures. Much later, the scientific discipline of anthropology would formalize the methods of ethnography as a scientific research strategy for documenting the beliefs, behavior, social roles and relationships, and worldview of another culture, and for explaining these factors with reference to the logic of that culture. His research methods and strategies for validating information provided by his informants are precursors of the methods and strategies of modern ethnography.

He systematically gathered knowledge from a range of diverse informants, including women, who were recognized as having knowledge of indigenous culture and tradition. He compared the answers obtained from his various sources. Some passages in his writings appear to be transcriptions of informants' statements about religious beliefs, society or nature. Other passages clearly reflect a consistent set of questions presented to different informants with the aim of eliciting information on specific topics. Some passages reflect Sahagún's own narration of events or commentary.

== Significance ==
During the period in which Sahagún conducted his research, the conquering Spaniards were greatly outnumbered by the conquered Aztecs, and were concerned about the threat of a native uprising. Some colonial authorities perceived his writings as potentially dangerous, since they lent credibility to native voices and perspectives. Sahagún was aware of the need to avoid running afoul of the Inquisition, which was established in Mexico in 1570.

Sahagún's work was originally conducted only in Nahuatl. To fend off suspicion and criticism, he translated sections of it into Spanish, submitted it to some fellow Franciscans for their review, and sent it to the King of Spain with some Friars returning home. His last years were difficult, because the utopian idealism of the first Franciscans in New Spain was fading while the Spanish colonial project continued as brutal and exploitative. In addition, millions of indigenous people died from repeated epidemics, as they had no immunity to Eurasian diseases. Some of his final writings express feelings of despair. The Crown replaced the religious orders with secular clergy, giving friars a much smaller role in the Catholic life of the colony. Franciscans newly arrived in the colony did not share the earlier Franciscans' faith and zeal about the capacity of the Indians. The pro-indigenous approach of the Franciscans and Sahagún became marginalized with passing years. The use of the Nahuatl Bible was banned, reflecting the broader global retrenchment of Catholicism under the Council of Trent. In 1575 the Council of the Indies banned all scriptures in the indigenous languages and forced Sahagún to hand over all of his documents about the Aztec culture and the results of his research. The respectful study of the local traditions has probably been seen as a possible obstacle to the Christian mission. Despite this ban, Sahagún made two more copies of his Historia general.

Sahagún's Historia general was unknown outside Spain for about two centuries. In 1793, a bibliographer catalogued the Florentine Codex in the Laurentian Library in Florence. The work is now carefully rebound in three volumes. A scholarly community of historians, anthropologists, art historians, and linguists has been investigating Sahagún's work, its subtleties and mysteries, for more than 200 years.

The Historia general is the product of one of the most remarkable social-science research projects ever conducted. It is not unique as a chronicle of encounters with the New World and its people, but it stands out due to Sahagún's effort to gather information about a foreign culture by interviewing people and gathering perspectives from within that culture. As Nicholson has stated, "the scope of the Historia's coverage of contact-period Central Mexico indigenous culture is remarkable, unmatched by any other sixteenth-century works that attempted to describe the native way of life." Although in his own mind Sahagún was a Franciscan missionary, he has also been referred to by scholars as the "father of American Ethnography".

== As a Franciscan Friar ==
Sahagún has been described as a missionary, ethnographer, linguist, folklorist, Renaissance humanist, historian and pro-indigenous. Scholars have explained these roles as emerging from his identity as a missionary priest, a participant in the Spanish evangelical fervor for converting newly encountered peoples, and as a part of the broader Franciscan millenarian project.

Founded by Francis of Assisi in the early 13th century, the Franciscan Friars emphasized devotion to the Incarnation, the humanity of Jesus Christ. Saint Francis developed and articulated this devotion based on his experiences of contemplative prayer in front the San Damiano Crucifix and the practice of compassion among lepers and social outcasts. Franciscan prayer includes the conscious remembering of the human life of Jesus and the practice of care for the poor and marginalized.

Saint Francis' intuitive approach was elaborated into a philosophical vision by subsequent Franciscan theologians, such as Bonaventure of Bagnoregio and John Duns Scotus, leading figures in the Franciscan intellectual tradition. The philosophy of Scotus is founded upon the primacy of the Incarnation, and may have been a particularly important influence on Sahagún, since Scotus's philosophy was taught in Spain at this time. Scotus absorbed the intuitive insights of St. Francis of Assisi and his devotion to Jesus Christ as a human being, and expressed them in a broader vision of humanity.

A religious philosophical anthropology — a vision of humanity — may shape a missionary's vision of human beings, and in turn the missionary's behavior on a cultural frontier. The pro-indigenous approach of the Franciscan missionaries in New Spain is consistent with the philosophy of Franciscan John Duns Scotus. In particular, he outlined a philosophical anthropology that reflects a Franciscan spirit.

Several specific dimensions of Sahagún's work (and that of other Franciscans in New Spain) reflect this philosophical anthropology. The native peoples were believed to have dignity and merited respect as human beings. The friars were, for the most part, deeply disturbed by the conquistadores' abuse of the native peoples. In Sahagún's collaborative approach, in which he consistently gave credit to his collaborators, especially Antonio Valeriano, the Franciscan value of community is expressed.

In his five decades of research, he practiced a Franciscan philosophy of knowledge in action. He was not content to speculate about these new peoples, but met with, interviewed and interpreted them and their worldview as an expression of his faith. While others – in Europe and New Spain – were debating whether or not the indigenous peoples were human and had souls, Sahagún was interviewing them, seeking to understand who they were, how they loved each other, what they believed, and how they made sense of the world. Even as he expressed disgust at their continuing practice of human sacrifice and what he perceived as their idolatries, he spent five decades investigating Aztec culture.

== Disillusionment with the "spiritual conquest" ==
Learning more about Aztec culture, Sahagún grew increasingly skeptical of the depth of the mass conversions in Mexico. He thought that many if not most of the conversions were superficial. He also became concerned about the tendency of his fellow Franciscan missionaries to misunderstand basic elements of traditional Aztec religious beliefs and cosmology. He became convinced that only by mastering native languages and worldviews could missionaries be effective in dealing with the Aztec people. He began informal studies of indigenous peoples, their beliefs, and religious practices.

In the Florentine Codex, Sahagún wrote numerous introductions, addresses "to the reader", and interpolations in which he expresses his own views in Spanish. In Book XI, The Earthly Things, he replaces a Spanish translation of Nahuatl entries on mountains and rocks to describe current idolatrous practices among the people. "Having discussed the springs, waters, and mountains, this seemed to me to be the opportune place to discuss the principal idolatries which were practiced and are still practiced in the waters and mountains."

In this section, Sahagún denounces the association of the Virgin of Guadalupe with a pagan Meso-American deity. The Franciscans were then particularly hostile to this cult because of its potential for idolatrous practice, as it conflated the Virgin Mary with an ancient goddess.

At this place [Tepeyac], [the Indians] had a temple dedicated to the mother of the gods, whom they called Tonantzin, which means Our Mother. There they performed many sacrifices in honor of this goddess...And now that a church of Our Lady of Guadalupe is built there, they also call her Tonantzin, being motivated by the preachers who called Our Lady, the Mother of God, Tonantzin. It is not known for certain where the beginning of this Tonantzin may have originated, but this we know for certain, that, from its first usage, the word means that ancient Tonantzin. And it is something that should be remedied, for the correct [native] name of the Mother of God, Holy Mary, is not Tonantzin, but Dios inantzin [Nahuatl for: the Mother of God]. It appears to be a Satanic invention to cloak idolatry under the confusion of this name, Tonantzin. And they now come to visit from very far away, as far away as before, which is also suspicious, because everywhere there are many churches of Our Lady and they do not go to them. They come from distant lands to this Tonantzin as in olden times.

Sahagún explains that a church of Santa Ana has become a pilgrimage site for Toci (Nahuatl: "our grandmother"). He acknowledges that Saint Ann is the mother of the Virgin Mary, and therefore literally the grandmother of Jesus, but Sahagún writes:

All the people who come, as in times past, to the feast of Toci, come on the pretext of Saint Ann, but since the word [grandmother] is ambiguous, and they respect the olden ways, it is believable that they come more for the ancient than the modern. And thus, also in this place, idolatry appears to be cloaked because so many people come from such distant lands without Saint Ann's ever having performed any miracles there. It is more apparent that it is the ancient Toci rather than Saint Ann [whom they worship].

But in this same section, Sahagún expressed his profound doubt that the Christian evangelization of the Indians would last in New Spain, particularly since the devastating plague of 1576 decimated the indigenous population and tested the survivors.

[A]s regards the Catholic Faith, [Mexico] is a sterile land and very laborious to cultivate, where the Catholic Faith has very shallow roots, and with much labor little fruit is produced, and from little cause that which is planted and cultivated withers. It seems to me the Catholic Faith can endure little time in these parts...And now, in the time of this plague, having tested the faith of those who come to confess, very few respond properly prior to the confession; thus we can be certain that, though preached to more than fifty years, if they were now left alone, if the Spanish nation were not to intercede, I am certain that in less than fifty years there would be no trace of the preaching which has been done for them.

== Sahagún's histories of the conquest ==
Sahagún wrote two versions of the conquest of the Aztec Empire, the first is Book 12 of the General History (1576) and the second is a revision completed in 1585. The version in the Historia general is the only narration of historical events, as opposed to information on general topics such as religious beliefs and practices and social structure. The 1576 text is exclusively from an indigenous, largely Tlatelolcan viewpoint. He revised the account in 1585 in important ways, adding passages praising the Spanish, especially the conqueror Hernan Cortés, rather than adhering to the indigenous viewpoint. The original of the 1585 manuscript is lost. In the late 20th century, a handwritten copy in Spanish was found by John B. Glass in the Boston Public Library, and has been published in facsimile and English translation, with comparisons to Book 12 of the General History. In his introduction ("To the reader") to Book 12 of the Historia general, Sahagún claimed the history of the conquest was a linguistic tool so that friars would know the language of warfare and weapons. Since compiling a history of the conquest from the point of view of the defeated Tenochtitlan-Tlatelolcan could be controversial for the Spanish crown, Sahagún may have been prudent in trying to shape how the history was perceived. Sahagún's 1585 revision of the conquest narrative, which included praise for Cortés and the Spanish conquest, was completed in a period when work on indigenous texts was under attack. Sahagún likely wrote this version with that political situation well in mind, when a narrative of the conquest entirely from the defeated Mexicans' viewpoint was suspect.

== Works ==
- Coloquios y Doctrina Christiana con que los doce frailes de San Francisco enviados por el papa Adriano VI y por el emperador Carlos V, convirtieron a los indios de la Nueva España. Facsimile edition. Introduction and notes by Miguel León-Portilla. Mexico: Universidad Nacional Autónoma de México 1986.
- The Florentine Codex: General History of the Things of New Spain, 12 volumes; translated by Arthur J. O. Anderson and Charles E. Dibble; University of Utah Press (January 7, 2002), hardcover, ISBN 087480082X ISBN 978-0874800821
- The Conquest of New Spain, 1585 Revision. translated by Howard F. Cline, notes and an introduction by S.L. Cline. Salt Lake City: University of Utah Press, 1989
- Primeros Memoriales. Norman: University of Oklahoma Press 1996.
- Psalmodia Christiana (1583). English translation by Arthur J.O. Anderson. Norman: University of Utah Press 1993.
- Psalmodia Christiana (1583). Complete digital facsimile of the first edition from the John Carter Brown Library
