= Arthur J. O. Anderson =

American anthropologist

Arthur James Outram Anderson (November 26, 1907 – June 3, 1996) was an American anthropologist specializing in Aztec culture and translator of the Nahuatl language.

== Early life ==
He was born on November 26, 1907.

In the 1970s he began working with James Lockhart and Frances Berdan on colonial-era local level Nahuatl texts, which are the core of the New Philology.

== Career ==
He was renowned for his and Charles E. Dibble's translation of the Florentine Codex by fray Bernardino de Sahagún, a project which took 30 years. The two also published a modern English translation of Book XII of the Florentine Codex, which gives an indigenous account of the conquest of Mexico. Anderson translated and wrote an extensive introduction to fray Bernardino de Sahagún's Psalmodia Christiana (Christian Psalmody) He also edited and published translations of formal linguistic texts by eighteenth-century Mexican Jesuit Francisco de Clavigero (1731-1787) outlining rules of the Mexican (Nahuatl) language.

Two publications on which he collaborated were Beyond the Codices, and The Tlaxcalan Actas. With Susan Schroeder, he translated and edited writings of seventeenth-century Nahua historian Chimalpahin. In 1994, a festschrift entitled Chipping away on earth: studies in prehispanic and colonial Mexico in honor of Arthur J.O. Anderson and Charles E. Dibble was published.

== Death ==
Anderson died of a cerebral hemorrhage on June 3, 1996.
