= Mines and Geosciences Bureau =

Philippine government agency

- Kawanihan ng Pagmimina at Agham-Panlupa

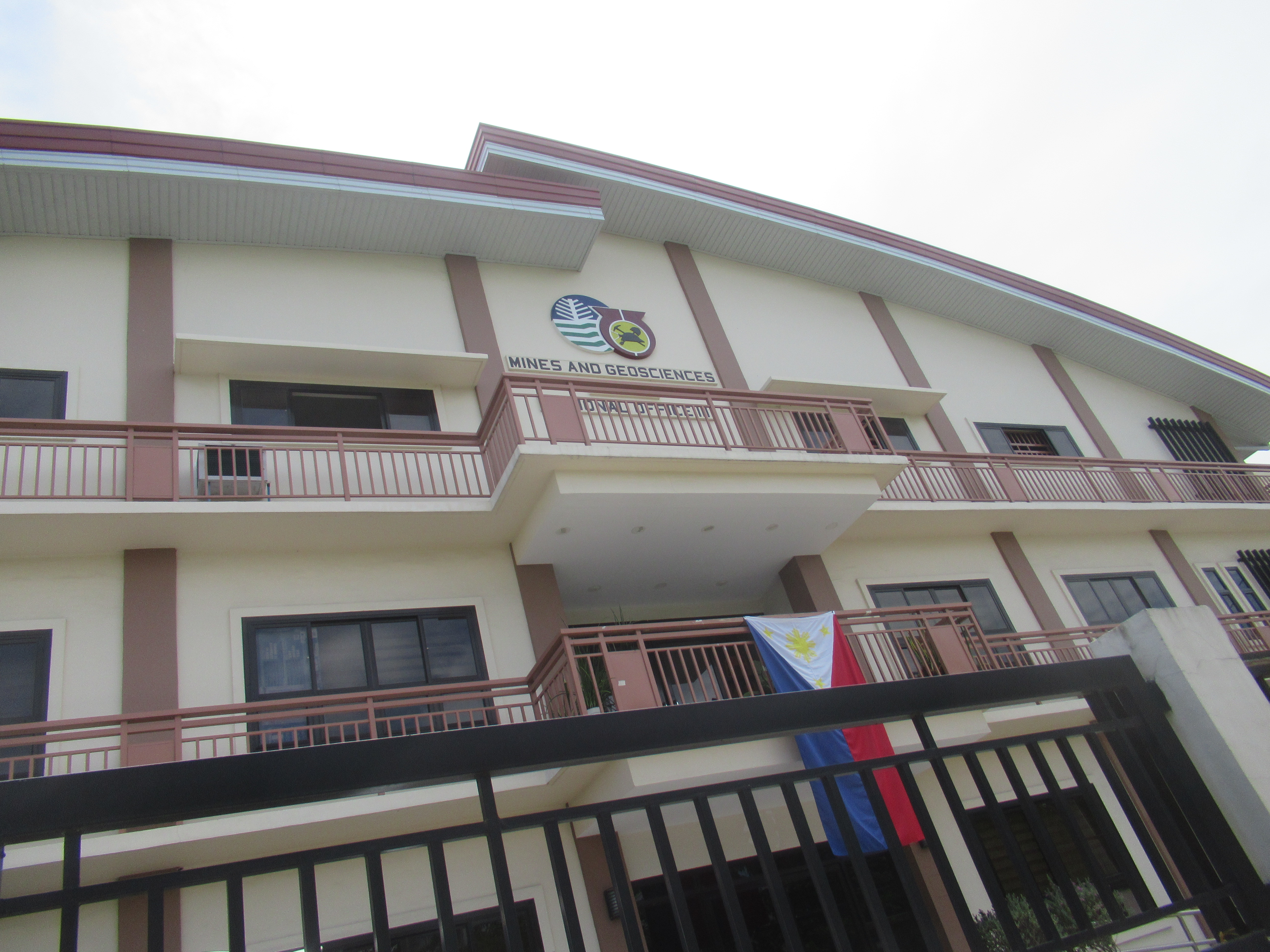
- MGB Regional Office No. III

Bureau overview
- Formed: March 10, 1900
- Headquarters: MGB Compound, North Avenue, Diliman, Quezon City; 14.652668°N 121.044624°E
- Employees: 959 (2024)
- Annual budget: ₱1.31 billion (2021)
- Bureau executive: Engr. Larry M. Heradez, OIC Director
- Website: www.mgb.gov.ph

Footnotes
- metallurgical, geology, mining, and geohazard assessment

The Mines and Geosciences Bureau (MGB) is a Philippine government agency under the Department of Environment and Natural Resources (DENR). The MGB is responsible for the conservation, management, development, and use of the country's mineral resources, including those in reservations and public lands.

The MGB absorbed the functions of the Bureau of Mines and Geosciences, except for line functions, which transferred mainly to DENR regional offices. MGB also absorbed the functions of the abolished Mineral Resources Development Board (MRDB) and the Gold Mining Industry Assistance Board (GMIAB).

== History ==
MGB took charge of the administration and disposition of minerals and mineral lands during the Spanish Regime, but was abolished on July 1, 1886. It was transfigured during Gen. Emilio Aguinaldo's ruling and created four divisions of Departamento de Fomento under the Philippine Revolutionary Republic. The Mines and Mountains Sections were also formed; the former was under the director of Industry and Agriculture, and the latter was under the director of Obras Publicas (Department of Public Works & Highways).

The sections were reorganized after the Americans’ arrival, resulting in the emergence of the Mining Bureau. In 1905, the Mining Bureau and the Bureau of Government Laboratories were fused under the Bureau of Science, and the Mining Bureau became the Division of Geology and Mines. In 1933, the Mineral Lands Division of the Bureau of Lands was merged with the Division of Geology and Mines under the Bureau of Science to form a division known as the Division of Mineral Resources under the Department of Agriculture and Commerce. After one year, it was renamed the Division of Mines.

With the Second World War outbreak, the Bureau of Mines was reconstituted under the Department of Agriculture and Commerce under Executive Order No. 1 dated January 30, 1942. In 1944, during the Puppet Philippine Republic, the Bureau of Mines shrunk again into a Division of the Department of Agriculture and Natural Resources. The revision of Commonwealth Act No. 136 in 1978 boosted it again, it was renamed Bureau of Mines and Geosciences Bureau. This gave it an additional function and the authority to make it more responsive to the objectives of the government's minerals sector.

In June 1987, the MGB was formed under Executive Order No. 192.

In 1997, under DAO 97–11, the MGB implemented a complete re-organization involving establishing two new divisions—the Mining Environment and Safety Division and the Mine Tenement Management Division. These divisions operationalized the sustainable development principles provision of the Mining Act of 1995.

== Services ==
=== Legal Service Division ===
The Legal Service Division (LSD) gives legal services to the MGB so that laws, rules and regulations, and policies about the management and acquisition of mineral lands and resources can be put into place in an effective and efficient Management Division.

=== Mining Tenements Management Division ===
The Mining Tenements Management Division (MTMD) is responsible for conducting the final review of all mining applications, auditing the disposal of mineral lands and resources, and managing the Mineral Rights Management System.

==== Sections ====
- Mining Permit Evaluation Section
- Systems Audit Development
- Mineral Rights Management System Section
- Mineral Lands Survey Section
- Mining Contract Evaluation Section

=== Mine Safety, Environment and Social Development Division ===
The Mine Safety, Environment, and Social Development Division (MSESDD) is responsible for instigating incidents and complaints and conducting research and development to improve mine safety and health programs, environmental management, and social development.

==== Sections ====
- Mine Environmental Management Section
- Mine Environmental Audit Section
- Mine Rehabilitation Section
- Social Development Section
- Mine Safety and Health Section

=== Mining Technology Division ===
The Mining Technology Division (MTD) is responsible for conducting Research and Development for the development of mining technologies, providing and coordinating mining technology support services, enforcing the technology transfer provisions of existing laws, rules, and regulations, implementing the National Small-Scale Mining Programs, and aiding in the investigation of complaints (including illegal mining activities).

==== Sections ====
- Mining Technology Development Section
- Mine Evaluation and Enforcement Section
- Small-Scale Mining Development Section
- Mineral Reserves Inventory Section

=== Lands Geological Survey Division ===
The Lands Geological Survey division does basic geological mapping, which serves as input for mineral exploration, energy exploration, water resources, geohazard assessment, engineering geology, environmental geology, and urban planning. It conducts engineering geological and geohazard assessments for housing, subdivision, infrastructure, and other land development projects. It addresses water-related concerns and assesses possible waste disposal sites. It is responsible for creating, maintaining, and enhancing geological database systems for the MGB.

==== Sections ====
- General Geology Section
- Economic Geology Section
- Hydrogeology and Environmental Geology Section
- Geological Laboratory Services Section
- Lands Geological Information Management Section
- Geohazard Assessment and Engineering Geology Section

=== Marine Geological Survey Division ===
The Marine Geological Survey Division conducts coastal and marine geological and geophysical surveys for mineral resource assessment, coastal geohazard assessment, geo-environmental and geoengineering studies for coastal infrastructure projects, and related geoscientific concerns. The Division also conducts research on marine geological technology and methodology, marine geology, and marine geophysics. It provides technical services concerning the conduct of marine geological and geophysical surveys.

==== Sections ====
- Coastal and Offshore Geological Survey Section
- Marine Geological Information Management Section
- Marine Technical Services Section
- Marine Mineral Exploration Section

=== Metallurgical Technology Division ===
The Metallurgical Technology Division (MeTD) is responsible for developing metallurgical techniques for beneficiating/extracting minerals/metals from ores, providing metallurgical and analytical services to the different mining stakeholders, and auditing mineral processing operations.

==== Sections ====
- Mineral Processing Service and Audit Section
- Mineral Processing Research and Development Section
- Chemical Laboratory Service Section
- Mechanical-Electrical Service Section

=== Mineral Economics, Information and Publication Division ===
The Mineral Economics, Information, and Publications Division (MEIPD) is responsible for conducting policy studies on mineral economics and disseminating data on mining and geosciences.

==== Sections ====
- Mineral Statistics Section
- Mineral Economics Section
- Mineral Information and Publication Section
- Library

=== Planning, Policy and International Affairs Division ===
The Planning, Policy, and International Affairs Division (PPIAD) is responsible for planning, programming, monitoring, and evaluating programs/projects/activities; initiating policy formulation; coordinating the development and implementation of programs/projects and policy formulation; initiating, coordinating, and maintaining international cooperation and commitments; and coordinating the design, installation, and maintenance of national and regional management information systems.

==== Sections ====
- Policy Studies and Project Development
- Planning and Monitoring
- Information System Group

=== Financial Management Division ===
The Financial Management Division (FMD) will provide financial analysis to assist in planning, monitoring, and decision-making.

==== Sections ====
- Budget
- Financial Service Group

=== Administrative Division ===
The Administrative Division (AD) is responsible for personnel, property, and record administration.

==== Sections ====
- Human Resource Management Section
- Cashiering Section
- General Services Section
- Property Management Section
- Records Management Section
- Engineering Service Unit
- Bids and Awards Committee (BAC)

== Regional Offices ==
Currently, there are 16 regional bureau offices in the entire country.

Region	Location/Address	Regional Director
Cordillera Administrative Region	Diego Silang Street, Baguio City 2602	Socrates G. Gaerlan
Ilocos Region	DENR Building, Government Center, Sevilla, San Fernando City, La Union 2500	Engr. Carlos A. Tayag, CESO V
Cagayan Valley	Regional Center, Carig, Tuguegarao City, Cagayan 3500	Engr. Mario A. Ancheta
Central Luzon	Matalino St., Diosdado Macapagal Government Center, Brgy. Maimpis, City of San Fernando, Pampanga	Noel B. Lacadin
Calabarzon	2nd flr. Puregold Jr., Brgy. Parian, Calamba City, Laguna	Engr. Edgardo D. Castillo
Mimaropa	7th flr., DENR by the Bay Bldg., Roxas Blvd., Ermita, Manila	Engr. Felizardo A. Gacad, Jr., CESO V
Bicol Region	DENR-V Annex Bldg. Regional Center Site, Rawis, Legazpi City, Albay	Engr. Guillermo A. Molina Jr. IV
Western Visayas	2nd Level, Queen City Garden Mall, J. de Leon Street, Iloilo City 5000	Cecilia L. Ochavo-Saycon (Officer-In-Charge)
Central Visayas	Greenplains Subdivision, Banilad, Mandaue City 6014	Al Emil G. Berador
Eastern Visayas	MacArthur Park, Candahug, Palo, Leyte 6501	Engr. Glenn Marcelo C. Noble
Zamboanga Peninsula	3rd & 4th Floor Mahinay Building, Roxas Street, Sta. Maria District, Pagadian City 7016	Engr. Hernani G. Abdon
Northern Mindanao	DENR 10 Compound, Macabalan, Cagayan de Oro City 9000	Engr. Rodante B. Felina (Officer-In-Charge)
Davao Region	2/F EMB-MGB Bldg., Brgy. 27-C, Davao City, 8000	Beverly Mae M. Brebante
Soccsksargen	Prime Regional Center, Carpenter Hill, Koronadal City, South Cotabato 9506	Engr. John Mikel P. Ansao
Caraga	Km. 2 National Highway, Surigao City, 8400	Engr. Francis Glenn N. Suante
Negros Island Region	Honorata Manalo Road (Buri Road), Brgy. Mandalagan, Bacolod City 6100	Benigno Cesar L. Espejo
