= Ben Kamihira =

Ben Kamihira (1925–2004) was an American artist and long-time teacher at the Pennsylvania Academy of Fine Arts. Though the dominant trend in painting during much of his career was towards abstraction, Kamihira's art was distinctly figurative.

== Biography ==
Kamihira was born to Issei parents in the rural environs of Yakima, Washington in 1925. Following the bombing of Pearl Harbor in 1941, Kamihira and his family were dispatched to an internment camp, and later sent to eastern Oregon to pick sugar beets. In 1944, Kamihira was drafted into the Army. He served for two years in the Japanese American 442nd Regimental Combat Team in Italy. It was during his time overseas that Kamihira first received drawing instruction and went to a museum. After his service, Kamihira utilized the G.I. Bill to study at the Art Institute of Pittsburgh (1946-1948), and later the Pennsylvania Academy of Fine Arts (1948-1952), where he studied under Walter Stuempfig and Francis Speight. Shortly after graduating from PAFA, Kamihira returned to his alma mater as a faculty member until his retirement in 1980.

Output from his early career included a series of still lives and Philadelphia-centered landscapes. Kamihira was awarded two Guggenheim fellowships, the second of which, awarded in 1956, he spent in Spain. During his time in Spain, he painted a Deposition of Christ which won the Pennsylvania Academy's Lippincott Award. Kamihira later served as artist-in-residence at Rice University. After his retirement from PAFA, he divided his time between Spain and his studio in Center City.

According to the Smithsonian American Art Museum, Kamihira's artistic style drew on influences as disparate as the Venetian masters of the sixteenth and seventeenth centuries—Veronese, Tintoretto, Guardi—in his focus on landscapes, figural subjects, and religion imagery, as well as European Surrealism of the 1930s in his spatial arrangements, use of illogical viewpoints and interest in texture and dramatic lighting.

Kamihira's work is part of the permanent collections of the Whitney Museum of American Art, the Brooklyn Museum, the Ringling Museum in Sarasota, Florida, the Dallas Museum of Fine Arts, and the Oklahoma Art Museum.
