= Chen Shou-yi =

Chinese literary historian

Chen Shou-yi in 1956

Ch'ên Shou-yi (Note: Sometimes spelled with alternate romanizations. In this Chinese name, the family name is Chen.) (Chinese: 陳受頤; 1899–1978) was a Chinese-American literary historian and cultural studies scholar. He is known for his contributions to the comparative cultural studies of China and the West. He was a professor at Pomona College in Claremont, California from 1941 to 1967.

== Early life and education ==
Chen was born in 1899 to a well-known literati family in Panyu, Guangdong, China, and received a traditional Confucian education before college. He completed his undergraduate studies at Canton Christian College in Guangzhou in 1920 and earned his doctorate in comparative literature from the University of Chicago in 1929.

== Career ==
In the 1920s, Chen was influential in the New Culture Movement under Hu Shih.

Chen was the chair of the history department at Peking University in Beijing from 1931 to 1937. In 1936, he took a sabbatical as a visiting professor at Pomona College in Claremont, California, but upon his return to China was confronted with the Second Sino-Japanese War.

Chen took a position at the University of Hawaiʻi at Mānoa in 1937. In 1941, he returned to Pomona as a professor, a position he held until his retirement in 1967.

In 1961, Chen published Chinese Literature: A Historical Introduction (Ronald Press), the second English language survey of Chinese literature after Herbert Giles' 1901 A History of Chinese Literature. Academic reviewers praised the work's wide breadth and attempt to fill a hole in the academic literature, but many criticized its lack of scholarly analysis and poor editing.

== Later life and death ==
Chen retired in 1967, but kept going to his office each day to continue his research. He died of illness in 1978. His family donated his papers to the Claremont Colleges' library, where they are kept in the special collections department.

== Recognition and legacy ==
Chen received widespread recognition for his scholarly work. He was elected a member of Academia Sinica, the highest honor given to academics in the Republic of China.

Chen is credited with helping to develop the Asian studies programs at Pomona and the other Claremont Colleges.
