= Charles E. Dibble =

American anthropologist and linguist (1909–2002)

Charles Elliot Dibble (18 August 1909 – 30 November 2002) was an American academic, anthropologist, linguist, and scholar of pre-Columbian Mesoamerican cultures. A former Distinguished Professor of Anthropology at the University of Utah, Dibble retired in 1978 after an association with the university as lecturer and researcher spanning four decades. Post-retirement Dibble continued to conduct and publish research in his area of expertise, studies of Mesoamerican historical literature and the historiography of conquest-era Mesoamerican cultures, in particular those of the Aztec and others of the central Mexican altiplano. Among many contributions to the field Dibble is perhaps most recognised for his collaboration with colleague Arthur J.O. Anderson, producing the modern annotated translation into English of the volumes of the Florentine Codex.

Born in Layton, Utah, Dibble attended the University of Utah, obtaining a B.A. in history in 1936. Dibble traveled to Mexico in the year preceding his graduation, and his experiences there shaped the direction of his future career as a Mesoamericanist scholar. Dibble enrolled at the Universidad Nacional Autónoma de México (UNAM) in Mexico City for postgraduate studies, completing a Master's degree in anthropology in 1938. Upon receiving his MA Dibble gained a teaching position at his alma mater in Utah commencing in 1939, where he would be based for the remainder of his long academic career. At the same time he pursued his doctoral studies at UNAM, and was awarded his PhD from UNAM in 1942. Dibble also undertook a year's post-doctoral work at Harvard, in 1943. In 1994, a festschrift entitled Chipping away on earth: studies in prehispanic and colonial Mexico in honor of Arthur J.O. Anderson and Charles E. Dibble was published.
