= Dempsters =

Dempsters was a privately held American company that over time produced submersible pumps, windmills and wind energy systems; water systems, recycling trailers, fertilizer equipment, and accessories. Originally named the Dempster Company and then the Dempster Wind Mill Company, it was incorporated under the laws of Nebraska in 1886 as Dempster Mill Manufacturing Company. The name was later changed to Dempster Industries and again to Dempster LLC. The company was headquartered in Beatrice, Nebraska.

== History ==
Founded in 1878 by Charles B. Dempster in Beatrice, Nebraska, the Dempster Mill Manufacturing Company was established to design and produce windmills, hand pumps, water well products, and agricultural equipment. The anticipated market included families headed west to begin a new life on homestead land offered by the U.S. government.(See Homestead Acts.) The company was originally located at the corner of Fourth and Court Streets. In 1884 brother A. R. Dempster joined the firm and in 1886 it moved to a new location on West Court Street, but frequent flooding from the Blue River necessitated a move in 1889 to a location at 711 South Sixth Street. At its high point in 1918 the company had 500 employees.

In 1950 the company facility was enlarged, remodeled and its exterior updated, and in 1960 Dempster Mill Mfg. Co. was purchased by Warren Buffett. It was then sold in 1963 to a group of investors and its name changed to Dempster Industries Incorporated.

In 1985 the company became privately owned with its purchase by Don Clark. In 2008 Wallace and Felicia Davis purchased the company; however, it was closed in 2011. In the summer of 2013, Ryan Mitchell and his company purchased the assets of the company with operations in Beatrice under Dempsters LLC. Long known for its windmills, pumps and associated equipment, the company included the manufacturing and distributing of recycling trailers as well as agricultural spreaders.

See also Homestead National Monument of America.

== Products ==
Dempsters operations were divided between the Pump Division, the Recycling Division and the Agriculture division. Products offered under this company structure included a wide variety of windmills (windpumps), pumps, pump motors, recycling trailers, and fertilizer spreaders.

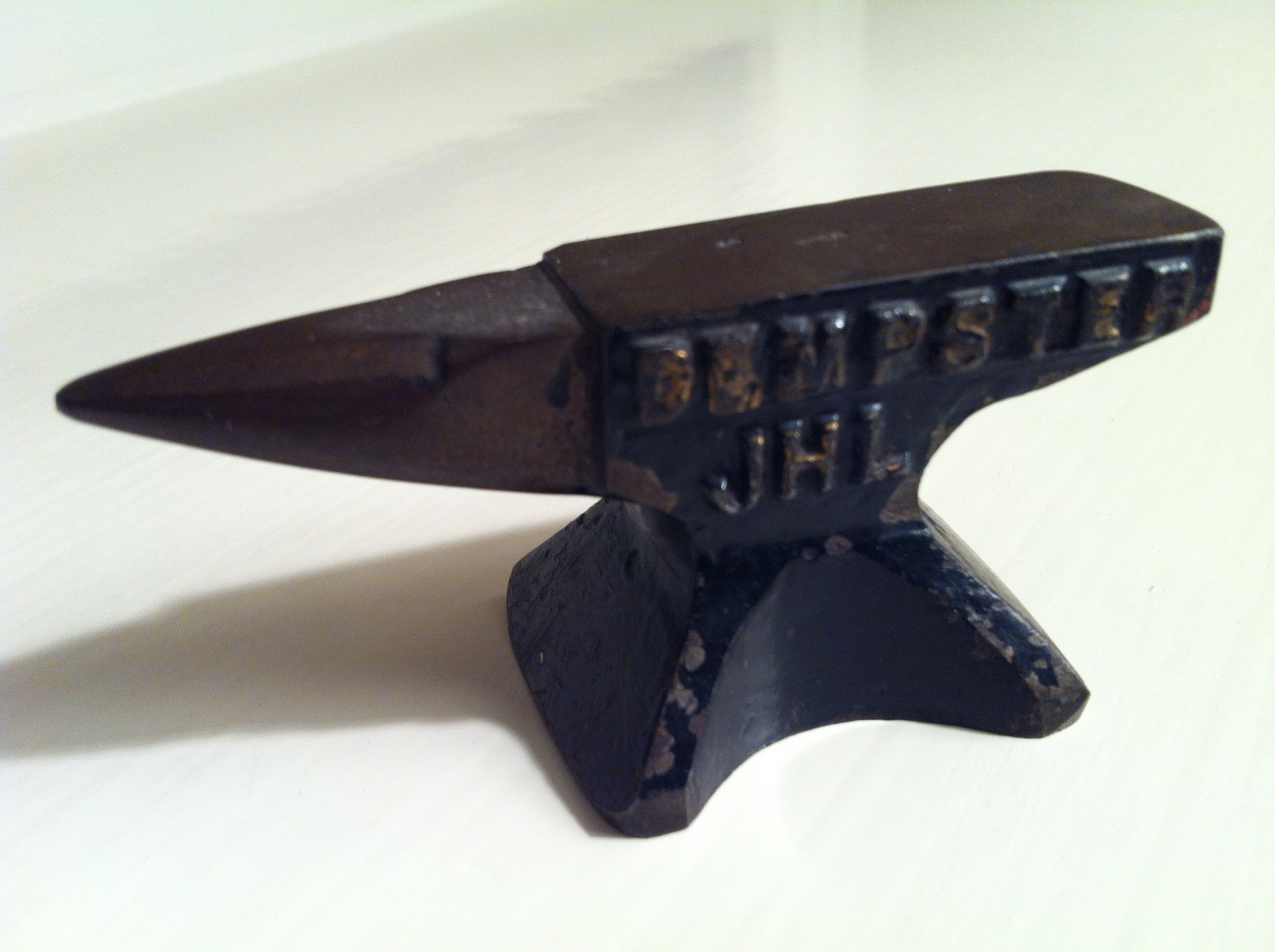
1928 Dempster Miniature Anvil

=== Windmills ===
Because of their prominence on the farms and ranches in the United States countryside, Dempster windmills may be the company's most recognized product. In 1885, Dempster produced its first pumping windmill, the Original Dempster Solid Wheel Mill. This wooden wheel mill was produced in both 10 and 12 foot diameter models. In 1892 the Beatrice company began to produce and market its first all steel mill, the Queen City. Over the next 50 years it produced a number of mill design variations which incorporated a guiding vane to orient the mill wheel with respect to the direction of the prevailing wind. These included the Original Solid Wheel, the Queen City, the Improved Queen City, the Dempster Steel Mill, the Improved Dempster Steel Mill, the Dempster No. 6, the No. 7, the Arrow Steel, the No. 8, the No. 9, the No. 10, the No. 11, and the very popular No. 12. (See reference 2) In 1931 the No. 12A model was introduced, which had a larger, heavier-duty gearbox than the No. 12. These mills are summarized in the table below.

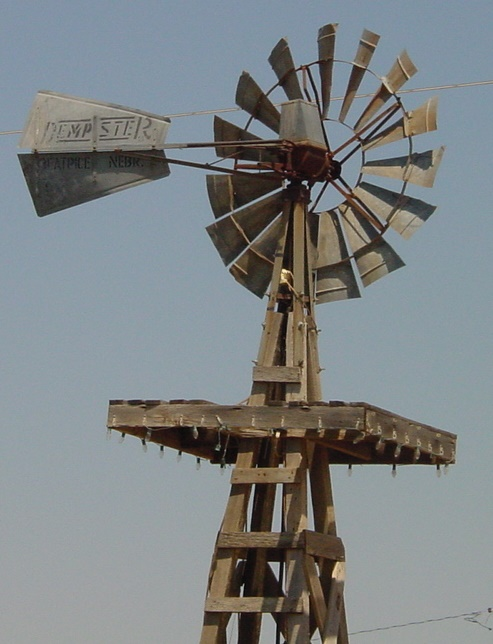
Dempster Windmill, San Jon, NM

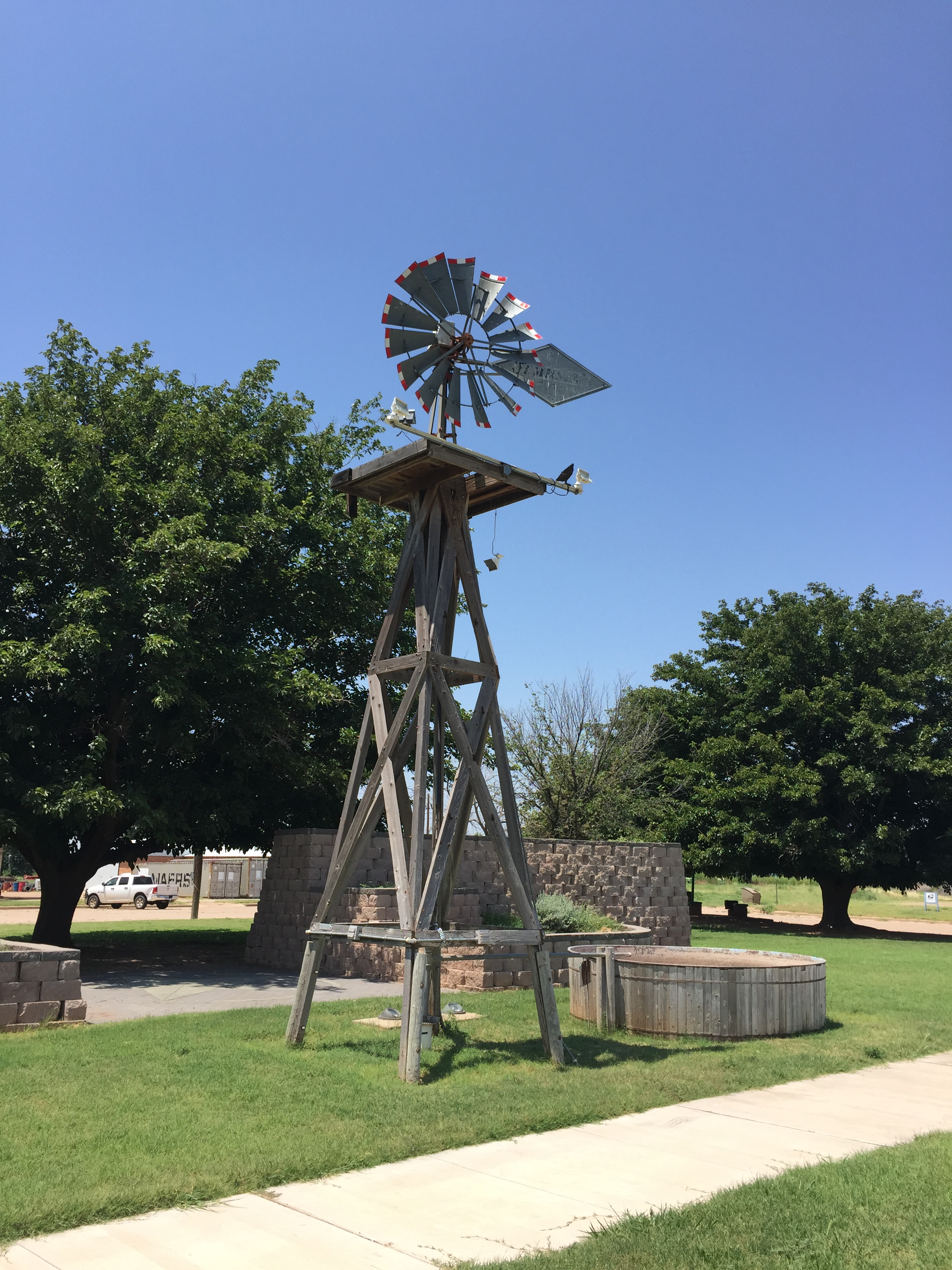
Diamond Vane Dempster Windmill, Estelline, TX

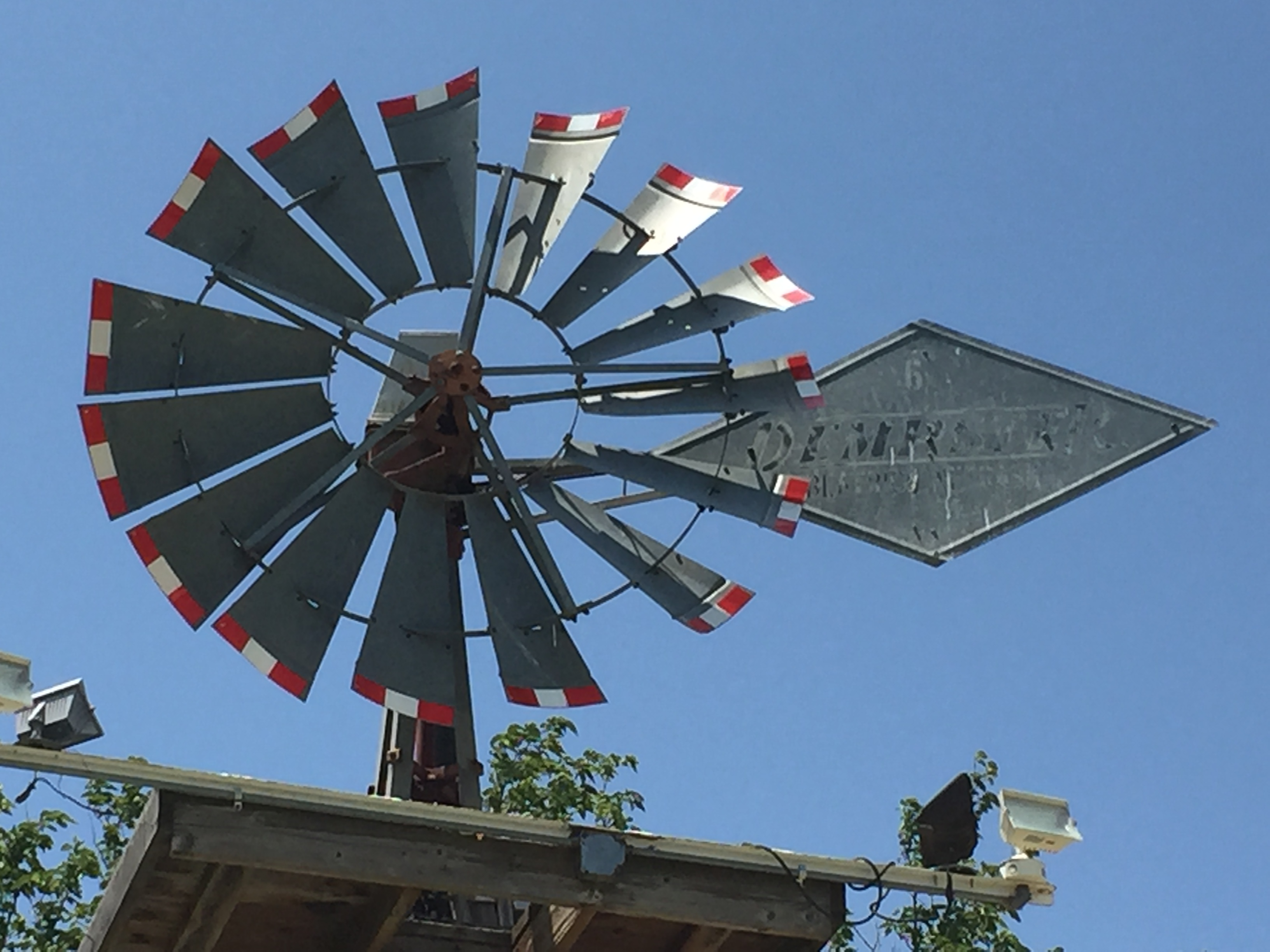
Diamond Vane Dempster Windmill, Estelline, TX

Date	Name	Wheel Diameter, ft.	Material
1885	Original Solid	10, 12	Wood
1892	Queen City	8	Steel
1895	Improved Queen City	8, 9, 10	Steel
1896	Dempster Steel	8, 10	Steel
1899	Improved Dempster Steel	8, 10	Steel
1903	Dempster No. 6 Steel	6, 8, 10, 12	Steel
1903	Dempster No. 7 Steel	6, 8, 10, 12	Steel
1906	Arrow	8	Steel
1907	Dempster No. 8 Steel	6, 8, 10, 12	Steel
1908	Dempster No. 9 Solid	10, 12, 14, 16, 18	Wood
1914	Dempster No. 10	6, 8, 10, 12	Steel
1922	Dempster No. 11 Self-Oiling	10, 12, 14	Wood or Steel
1925	Dempster No. 12 Annu-Oiled	6, 8, 10	Steel
1922	Dempster No. 12 Annu-Oiled	8, 10	Steel
1929	Dempster No. 12 Annu-Oiled	6, 8, 10	Steel
1931	Dempster No. 12A Annu-Oiled	8	Steel

In 1981 Dempster replaced the arrow shaped vane on the No. 12 mills with a diamond-shaped vane patterned after the company logo, which was "DEMPSTER" superposed on a diamond-shaped background. After two years it was determined in the field that the new vane did not function as effectively as the old one, and the diamond-shaped vane was dropped in 1983.

In addition to these many mill designs that included a vane for direction control, the company designed, produced and marketed five different vaneless windmills between 1892 and 1941 - the No. 1, 2, 3, 4, and 14. The No. 14 was a self-oiling direct stroke mill.

Dempster No. 3 Vaneless
