= Florentine Codex =

Text by Bernardino de Sahagún

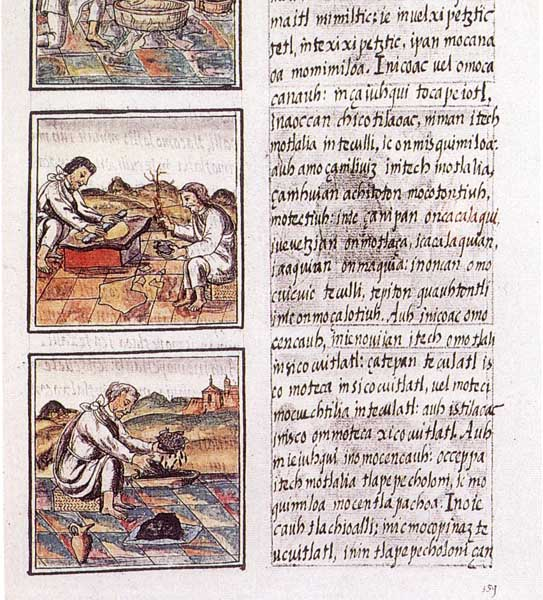
Page 51 of Book IX from the Florentine Codex. The text is in Nahuatl; World Digital Library.

The Florentine Codex is a 16th-century ethnographic research study in Mesoamerica by the Spanish Franciscan friar Bernardino de Sahagún. Sahagún originally titled it La Historia General de las Cosas de Nueva España (in English: The General History of the Things of New Spain). The best-preserved manuscript is commonly referred to as the Florentine Codex, as the codex is held in the Laurentian Library of Florence, Italy.

In partnership with Nahua elders and authors who were formerly his students at the Colegio de Santa Cruz de Tlatelolco, Sahagún conducted research, organized evidence, wrote and edited his findings. He worked on this project from 1545 up until his death in 1590. The work consists of 2,500 pages organized into twelve books; more than 2,000 illustrations drawn by native artists provide vivid images of this era. It documents the culture, religious cosmology (worldview) and ritual practices, society, economics, and natural history of the Aztec people. It has been described as "one of the most remarkable accounts of a non-Western culture ever composed."

Charles E. Dibble and Arthur J. O. Anderson were the first to translate the Codex from Nahuatl to English, in a project that took 30 years to complete. In 2012, high-resolution scans of all volumes of the Florentine Codex, in Nahuatl and Spanish, with illustrations, were added to the World Digital Library. In 2015, Sahagún's work was inscribed into the Memory of the World register by UNESCO. In 2023, the Getty Research Institute released the Digital Florentine Codex which gives access to the complete manuscript.

== History of the manuscript ==
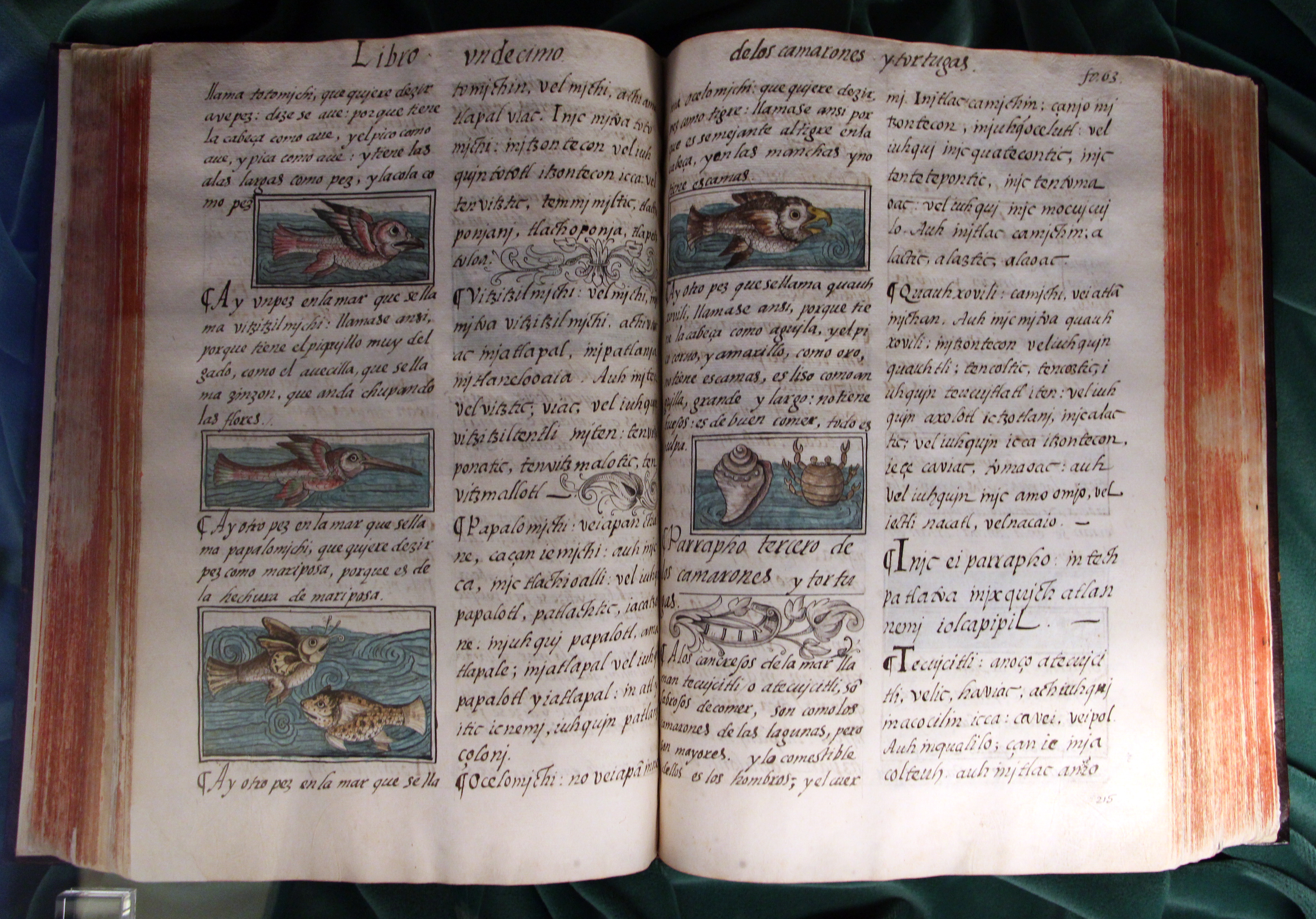
Historia general de las Cosas de Nueva España (original from the Biblioteca Medicea Laurenziana)

In 1575 the Council of the Indies suggested to the Spanish Crown to educate the Indigenous peoples in Spanish instead of using the Indigenous languages. For this reason, the Spanish authorities required Fray Sahagún to hand over all of his documents about the Aztec culture and the results of his research in order to get further details about this matter. In the meantime, the Bishop of Sigüenza, Diego de Espinosa, who was also the Inquisitor General and President of the Royal Council of Castile, instructed the cleric Luis Sánchez to report about the situation of the native Americans. The concerning findings of this report triggered a visit by Juan de Ovando to the Council of the Indies because it demonstrated a total ignorance of the Spanish authorities about the native cultures and, in Ovando's opinion, was not possible to make correct decisions without reliable information. As a consequence, the Council of the Indies ordered the Viceroyalty of Peru in 1568 to include ethnographic and geographic information regarding any new discovery within their limits. A similar disposition was given to the Viceroyalty of New Spain in 1569, specifying that 37 chapters were to be reported; in 1570, the extent of the report was modified to required information for 200 chapters. That same year, Philip II of Spain created a new position as "Cosmógrafo y Cronista Mayor de Indias" to collect and organize this information. He appointed Don Juan López de Velasco, so that he could write "La Historia General de las Indias". His primary focus was a compilation about the history of the Indies.

Phillip II concluded that was not beneficial for the Spanish colonies in America and, hence, it never took place. That is the reason why the missionaries, including Fray Bernardino de Sahagún continued their missionary work and Fray Bernardino de Sahagun was able to make two more copies of his Historia general. The three bound volumes of the Florentine Codex are found in the Biblioteca Medicea-Laurenziana, Palat. 218-220 in Florence, Italy, with the title Florentine Codex chosen by its English translators, Americans Arthur J.O. Anderson and Charles Dibble, following in the tradition of nineteenth-century Mexican scholars Francisco del Paso y Troncoso and Joaquín García Icazbalceta.

The manuscript became part of the collection of the Laurentian Library in Florence at some point after its creation in the late sixteenth century. It was not until the late eighteenth century that scholars became aware of it, when the bibliographer Angelo Maria Bandini published a description of it in Latin in 1793. The work became more generally known in the nineteenth century, with a description published by P. Fr. Marcellino da Civezza in 1879.

The Spanish Royal Academy of History learned of this work and, at the fifth meeting of the International Congress of Americanists, the find was announced to the larger scholarly community. In 1888, German scholar Eduard Seler presented a description of the illustrations at the 7th meeting of the International Congress of Americanists. Mexican scholar Francisco del Paso y Troncoso received permission in 1893 from the Italian government to copy the alphabetic text and the illustrations.

The three-volume manuscript of the Florentine Codex has been intensely analyzed and compared to earlier drafts found in Madrid. The Tolosa Manuscript (Códice Castellano de Madrid) was known in the 1860s and studied by José Fernando Ramírez. The Tolosa Manuscript has been the source for all published editions in Spanish of the Historia General.

The English translation of the complete Nahuatl text of all twelve volumes of the Florentine Codex was a decades-long work of Arthur J.O. Anderson and Charles Dibble, an important contribution to the scholarship on Mesoamerican ethno-history. In 1979, the Mexican government published a full-color, three-volume facsimile of the Florentine Codex in a limited edition of 2,000, allowing scholars to have easier access to the manuscript. The Archivo General de la Nación (Dra. Alejandra Moreno Toscano, director) supervised the project that was published by the Secretariat of the Interior (Enrique Olivares Santana, Secretary). The 2012 World Digital Library high-resolution digital version of the manuscript makes it fully accessible online to all those interested in this source for Mexican and Aztec history. In 2023, the Getty Research Institute released the Digital Florentine Codex which gives access to the complete manuscript and multiple translations.

== Sahagún's motivations for research ==
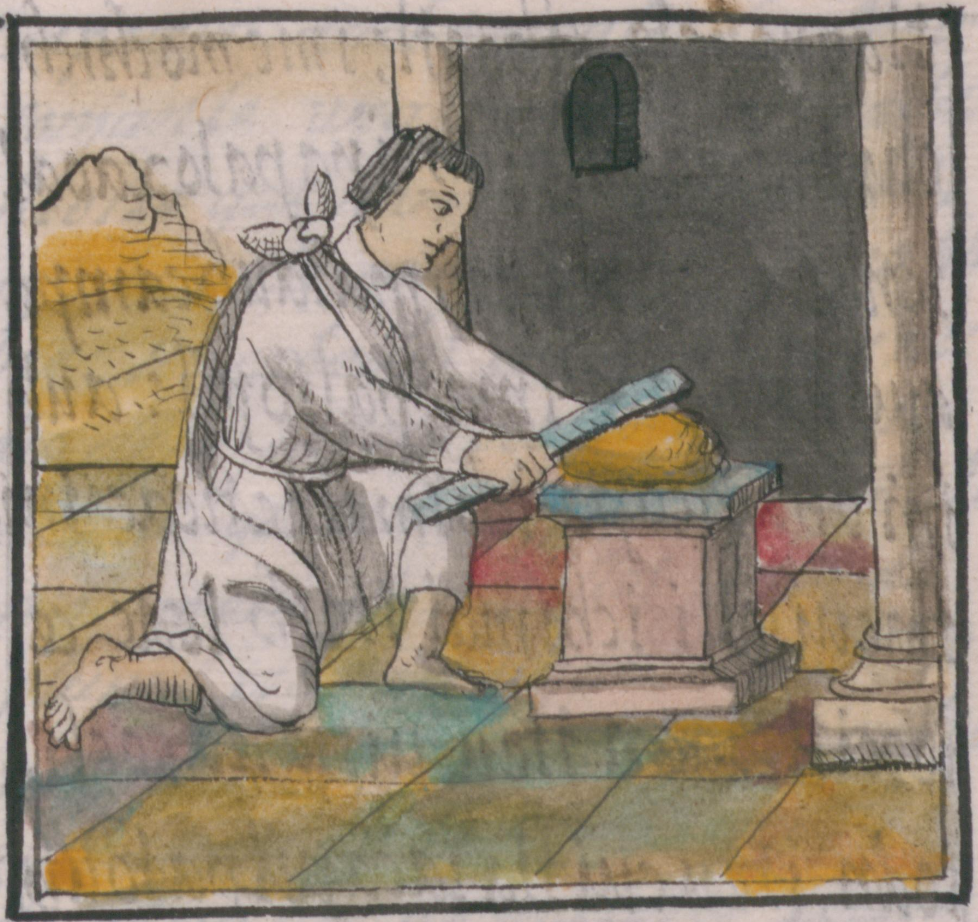
Goldsmith measuring a gold article

The missionary Sahagún had the goal of evangelizing the indigenous Mesoamerican peoples, and his writings were devoted to this end. He described this work as an explanation of the "divine, or rather idolatrous, human, and natural things of New Spain". He compared its body of knowledge to that needed by a physician to cure the "patient" suffering from idolatry.

He had three overarching goals for his research:

1. To describe and explain ancient Indigenous religion, beliefs, practices, deities. This was to help friars and others understand this "idolatrous" religion in order to evangelize the Aztecs.
2. To create a vocabulary of the Aztec language, Nahuatl. This provides more than definitions from a dictionary, as it gives an explanation of their cultural origins, with pictures. This was to help friars and others learn Nahuatl and to understand the cultural context of the language.
3. To record and document the great cultural inheritance of the Indigenous peoples of New Spain.

Sahagún conducted research for several decades, edited and revised his work over several decades, created several versions of a 2,400-page manuscript, and addressed a cluster of religious, cultural and nature themes. Copies of the work were sent by ship to the royal court of Spain and to the Vatican in the late-sixteenth century to explain Aztec culture. The copies of the work were essentially lost for about two centuries, until a scholar rediscovered it in the Laurentian Library (Biblioteca Medicea Laurenziana) an archive library in Florence, Italy. The Spanish also had earlier drafts in their archives. A scholarly community of historians, anthropologists, art historians, and linguists has since been investigating Sahagún's work, its subtleties and mysteries, for more than 200 years.

== Evolution, format, and structure ==
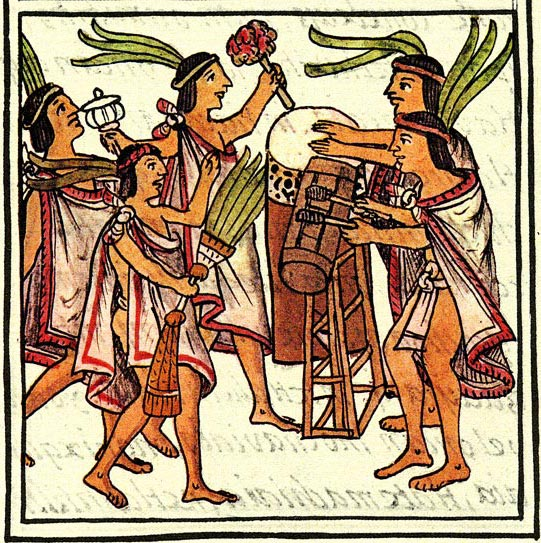
An illustration of the "One Flower" ceremony, from the 16th-century Florentine Codex. The two drums are the teponaztli (foreground) and the huehuetl (background).

The Florentine Codex is a complex document, assembled, edited, and appended over decades. Essentially it is three integral texts: (1) in Nahuatl; (2) a Spanish text; (3) pictorials. The final version of the Florentine Codex was completed in 1569. Sahagún's goals of orienting fellow missionaries to Aztec culture, providing a rich Nahuatl vocabulary, and recording the indigenous cultural heritage are at times in competition within the work. The manuscript pages are generally arranged in two columns, with Nahuatl, written first, on the right and a Spanish gloss or translation on the left. Diverse voices, views, and opinions are expressed in these 2,400 pages, and the result is a document that is sometimes contradictory.

Scholars have proposed several classical and medieval worldbook authors who inspired Sahagún, such as Aristotle, Pliny the Elder, Isidore of Seville, and Bartholomeus Anglicus. These shaped the late medieval approach to the organization of knowledge.

The twelve books of the Florentine Codex are organized in the following way:

1. Gods, religious beliefs and rituals, cosmology, and moral philosophy
2. Humanity (society, politics, economics, including anatomy and disease)
3. Natural history and general history

Book 12, the account of the conquest of the Aztec Empire from the point of view of the conquered of Tenochtitlan-Tlatelolco, is the only strictly historical book of the Historia General.

This work follows the organizational logic found in medieval encyclopedias, in particular the 19-volume De proprietatibus rerum of Sahagún's fellow Franciscan Friar Bartholomew the Englishman. One scholar has argued that Bartholomew's work served as a conceptual model for Sahagún, although evidence is circumstantial. Both men present descriptions of the cosmos, society and nature of the late medieval paradigm. Additionally, in one of the prologues, Sahagún assumes full responsibility for dividing the Nahuatl text into books and chapters, quite late into the evolution of the Codex (approximately 1566–1568). "Very likely," historian James Lockhart notes, "Sahagún himself devised the chapter titles, in Spanish, and the Nahuatl chapter titles may well be a translation of them, reversing the usual process."

== Images within the Florentine Codex ==
After the facsimile edition became available generally in 1979, the illustrations of the Florentine Codex could be analyzed in detail. Previously, the images were known mainly through the black-and-white drawings found in various earlier publications, which were separated from the alphabetic text. The images in the Florentine Codex were created as an integral element of the larger work. Although many of the images show evidence of European influence, a careful analysis by one scholar posits that they were created by "members of the hereditary profession of tlacuilo or native scribe-painter".

The images were inserted in places in the text left open for them, and in some cases the blank space has not been filled. This strongly suggests that when the manuscripts were sent to Spain, they were as yet unfinished. The images are of two types, what can be called "primary figures" that amplify the meaning of the alphabetic texts, and "ornamentals" that were decorative. The majority of the nearly 2,500 images are "primary figures" (approximately 2000), with the remainder ornamental. The figures were drawn in black outline first, with color added later. Scholars have concluded that several artists, of varying skill, created the images. It was deduced that twenty-two artists worked on the images in the Codex. This was done by analyzing the different ways that forms of body were drawn, such as the eyes, profile, and proportions of the body.

It is not clear what artistic sources the scribes drew from, but the library of the Colegio de Santa Cruz de Tlatelolco had European books with illustrations and books of engravings. European elements appear in the imagery, as well as pre-Conquest images done in the "native style". A number of the images have Christian elements, which Peterson has described as "Christian editorializing". The entirety of the Codex is characterized by the Nahua belief that the use of color activates the image and causes it to embody the true nature, or ixiptla, of the object or person depicted. For the Aztecs, the true self or identity of a person or object was shown via the external layer, or skin. Imparting color onto an image would change it so that it was given the identity of what it was portraying. Color was also used as a vehicle to impart knowledge that worked in tandem with the image itself.

== Books ==
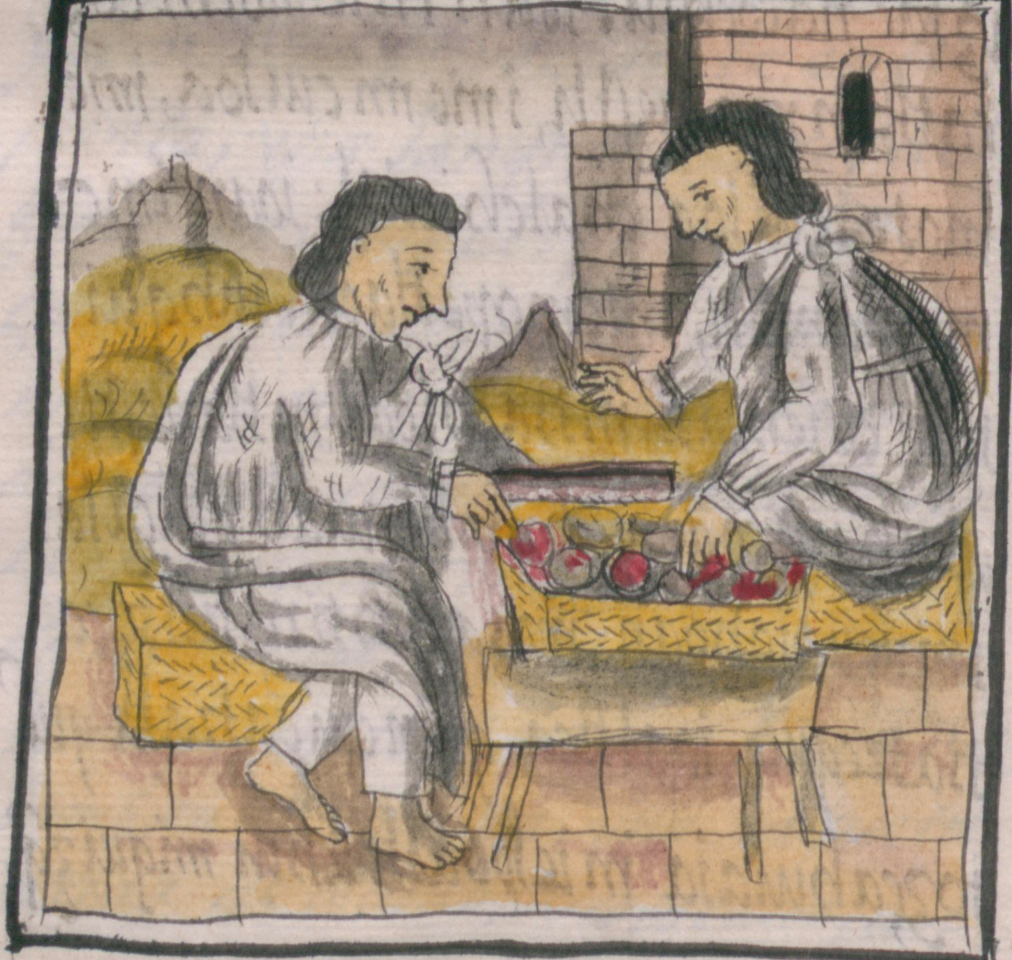
Merchants selecting gemstones, from Book 9 of the Codex.

The codex is composed of the following twelve books:

1. The Gods. Deals with gods worshipped by the natives of this land, which is New Spain.
2. The Ceremonies. Deals with holidays and sacrifices with which these natives honored their gods in times of infidelity.
3. The Origin of the Gods. About the creation of the gods.
4. The Soothsayers. About Indian judiciary astrology or omens and fortune-telling arts.
5. The Omens. Deals with foretelling these natives made from birds, animals, and insects in order to foretell the future.
6. Rhetoric and Moral Philosophy. About prayers to their gods, rhetoric, moral philosophy, and theology in the same context.
7. The Sun, Moon and Stars, and the Binding of the Years. Deals with the sun, the moon, the stars, and the jubilee year.
8. Kings and Lords. About kings and lords, and the way they held their elections and governed their reigns.
9. The Merchants. About long-distance elite merchants, pochteca, who expanded trade, reconnoitered new areas to conquer, and served as agents-provocateurs.
10. The People. About general history: it explains vices and virtues, spiritual as well as bodily, of all manner of persons.
11. Earthly Things. About properties of animals, birds, fish, trees, herbs, flowers, metals, and stones, and about colors.
12. The Conquest. About the conquest of New Spain from the Tenochtitlan-Tlatelolco point of view.

== Ethnographic methodologies ==
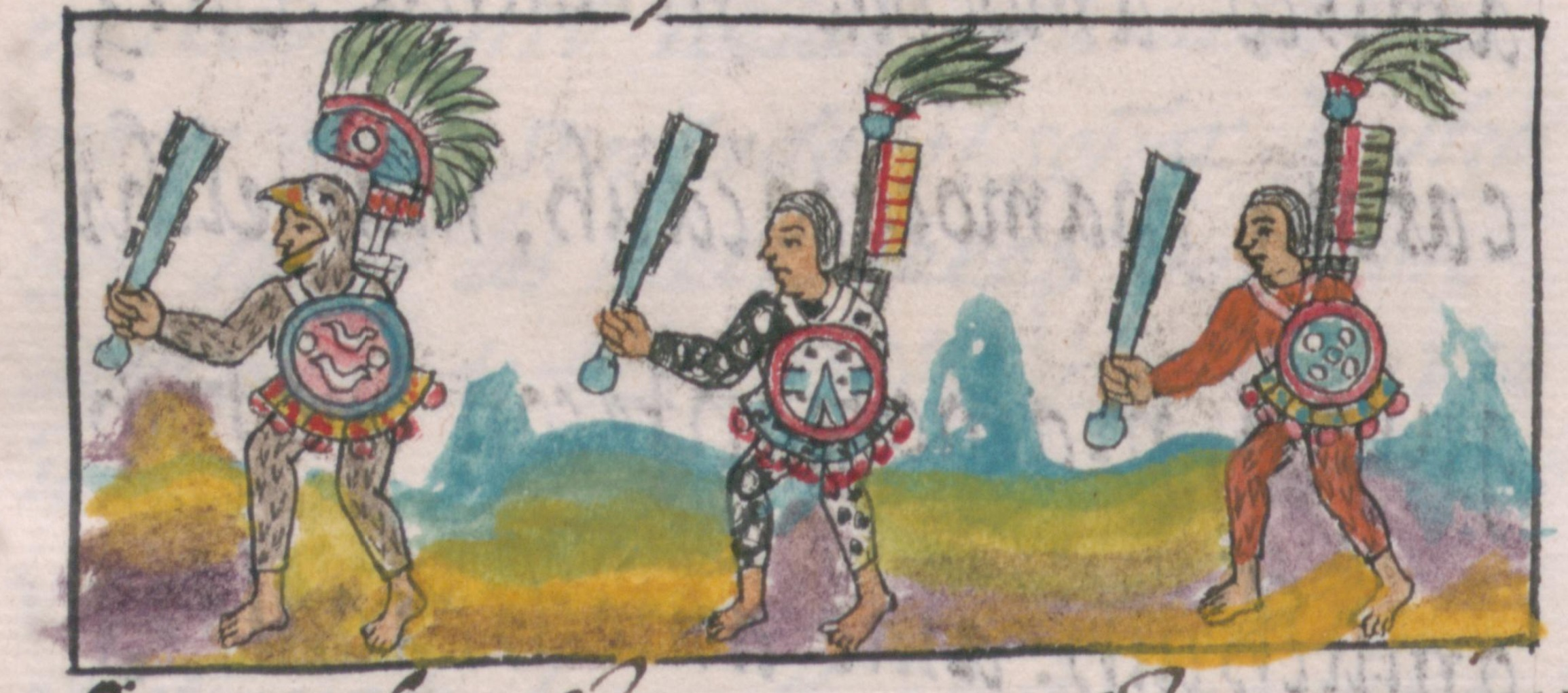
Aztec warriors as shown in the Florentine Codex

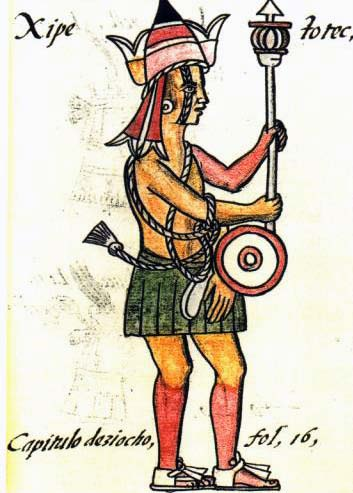
Xipe Totec, "Our Lord the Flayed One", an Aztec (Mexica) deity

Sahagún was among the first people to develop an array of strategies for gathering and validating knowledge of indigenous New World cultures. Much later, the discipline of anthropology would later formalize these as ethnography. This is the scientific research strategy to document the beliefs, behavior, social roles and relationships, and worldview of another culture, and to explain these within the logic of that culture. Ethnography requires scholars to practice empathy with persons very different from them, and to try to suspend their own cultural beliefs in order to enter into, understand, and explain the worldview of those living in another culture.

Sahagún systematically gathered knowledge from a range of diverse persons (now known as informants in anthropology), who were recognized as having expert knowledge of Aztec culture. He did so in the native language of Nahuatl, while comparing the answers from different sources of information. According to James Lockhart, Sahagún collected statements from indigenous people of "relatively advanced age and high status, having what was said written down in Nahuatl by the aids he had trained."

Some passages appear to be the transcription of spontaneous narration of religious beliefs, society or nature. Other parts clearly reflect a consistent set of questions presented to different people designed to elicit specific information. Some sections of text report Sahagún's own narration of events or commentary.

He developed a methodology with the following elements:

1. Use the indigenous Nahuatl language.
2. Elicit information from elders, cultural authorities publicly recognized as the most knowledgeable.
3. Adapt the project to the ways in which Aztec culture recorded and transmitted knowledge.
4. Use the expertise of former students at the Colegio de Santa Cruz de Tlatelolco, crediting them by name.
5. Attempt to capture the totality or complete reality of Aztec culture on its own terms.
6. Structure inquiry by using questionnaires, and adapt to using more valuable information shared by other means.
7. Attend to the diverse ways that diverse meanings are transmitted through Nahuatl linguistics.
8. Undertake a comparative evaluation of information, drawing from multiple sources, to determine the degree of confidence with which he could regard that information.
9. Collect information on the conquest of the Aztec Empire from the point of view of the Tenochtitlan-Tlatelolco, that had been defeated.

These methodological innovations substantiate historians' claim that Sahagún was the first anthropologist.

Most of the Florentine Codex is alphabetic text in Nahuatl and Spanish, but its 2,000 pictures provide vivid images of sixteenth-century New Spain. Some of these images directly support the alphabetic text; others are thematically related; others are for seemingly decorative purposes. Some are colorful and large, taking up most of a page; others are black and white sketches. The pictorial images offer remarkable detail about life in New Spain, but they do not bear titles, and the relationship of some to the adjoining text is not always self-evident. They can be considered a "third column of language" in the manuscript. Several different artists' hands have been identified, and many questions about their accuracy have been raised. The drawings convey a blend of Indigenous and European artistic elements and cultural influences.

Many passages of the texts in the Florentine Codex present descriptions of like items (e.g., gods, classes of people, animals) according to consistent patterns. Because of this, scholars have concluded that Sahagún used a series of questionnaires to structure his interviews and collect data.

For instance, the following questions appear to have been used to gather information about the gods for Book One:

1. What are the titles, the attributes, or the characteristics of the god?
2. What were his powers?
3. What ceremonies were performed in his honor?
4. What was his attire?

For Book Ten, "The People", a questionnaire may have been used to gather information about the social organization of labor and workers, with questions such as:

1. What is the (trader, artisan) called and why?
2. What particular gods did they venerate?
3. How were their gods attired?
4. How were they worshiped?
5. What do they produce?
6. How did each occupation work?

This book also described some other indigenous groups in Mesoamerica.

Sahagún was particularly interested in Nahua medicine. The information he collected is a major contribution to the history of medicine generally. His interest was likely related to the high death rate at the time from plagues and diseases. Many thousands of people died, including friars and students at the school. Sections of Books Ten and Eleven describe human anatomy, disease, and medicinal plant remedies. Sahagún named more than a dozen Aztec doctors who dictated and edited these sections. A questionnaire such as the following may have been used in this section:

1. What is the name of the plant (plant part)?
2. What does it look like?
3. What does it cure?
4. How is the medicine prepared?
5. How is it administered?
6. Where is it found?

The text in this section provides very detailed information about location, cultivation, and medical uses of plants and plant parts, as well as information about the uses of animal products as medicine. The drawings in this section provide important visual information to amplify the alphabetic text. The information is useful for a wider understanding of the history of botany and the history of zoology. Scholars have speculated that Sahagún was involved in the creation of the Badianus Manuscript, an herbal created in 1552 that has pictorials of medicinal plants and their uses. Although this was originally written in Nahuatl, only the Latin translation has survived.

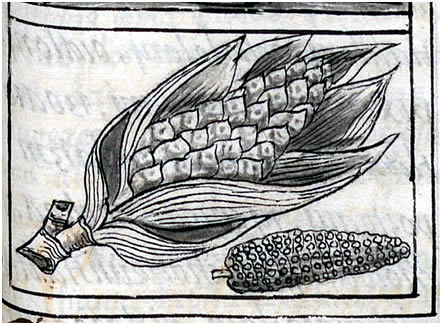
One of the first images of maize to be sent to Europe

Book Eleven, "Earthly Things", has the most text and approximately half of the drawings in the codex. The text describes it as a "forest, garden, orchard of the Mexican language". It describes the Aztec cultural understanding of the animals, birds, insects, fish and trees in Mesoamerica.

Sahagún appeared to have asked questions about animals such as the following:

1. What is the name of the animal?
2. What animals does it resemble?
3. Where does it live?
4. Why does it receive this name?
5. What does it look like?
6. What habits does it have?
7. What does it feed on?
8. How does it hunt?
9. What sounds does it make?

Plants and animals are described in association with their behavior and natural conditions or habitat. The Nahua presented their information in a way consistent with their worldview. For modern readers, this combination of ways of presenting materials is sometimes contradictory and confusing. Other sections include data on minerals, mining, bridges, roads, types of terrain, and food crops.

The Florentine Codex is one of the most remarkable social science research projects ever conducted. It is not unique as a chronicle of encountering the New World and its peoples, for there were others in this era. Sahagún's methods for gathering information from the perspective within a foreign culture were highly unusual for this time. He reported the worldview of people of Central Mexico as they understood it, rather than describing the society exclusively from the European perspective. "The scope of the Historia's coverage of contact-period Central Mexico indigenous culture is remarkable, unmatched by any other sixteenth-century works that attempted to describe the native way of life." Foremost in his own mind, Sahagún was a Franciscan missionary, but he may also rightfully be given the title as Father of American Ethnography.

== Editions ==
- Bernardino de Sahagún, translated from Nahuatl to English by Arthur J. O. Anderson and Charles E. Dibble; The Florentine Codex : General History of the Things of New Spain, 12 volumes; University of Utah Press (January 7, 2002), hardcover, ISBN 087480082X ISBN 978-0874800821
- Sahagún, Bernardino de; Kupriienko, Sergii (2013) [2013]. General history of the affairs of New Spain. Books X-XI: Aztec's Knowledge in medicine and botany. Kyiv: Видавець Купрієнко С.А. ISBN 978-617-7085-07-1.
- "We People Here: Nahuatl Accounts of the Conquest of Mexico" contains Book XII translated from Nahuatl to English by James Lockhart (2004) ISBN 9781592446810

== See also ==
- Aztec codices
- Bernardino de Sahagún
- Colegio de Santa Cruz de Tlatelolco
- Diego Durán
- Pedro Cieza de Leon
- Huarochirí Manuscript (a partial Andean parallel)
