= Robert K. Burns =

American biologist

Robert Kyle Burns (July 26, 1896 – June 26, 1982) was an American biologist known for his work on sexual differentiation in vertebrates. Burns was elected to the National Academy of Sciences in 1955. The New York Times reported in 1937 that Burns together with Thomas R. Forbes were able to change the sex of alligators by injecting them with female hormones. The National Academies Press said that Burns "pioneered the experimental manipulation of sex hormones in order to establish their roles in sex determination and differentiation".

== Education ==
Burns received his Ph.D. from Yale University in 1924.
