= George C. Schoolfield =

George C. Schoolfield (August 14, 1925 – July 21, 2016), was a professor emeritus of German and Scandinavian studies who wrote and contributed to over 400 publications on German and Scandinavian literature.

He was born in Charleston, West Virginia, and graduated from the University of Cincinnati in 1946 in Classics and German. After receiving his Ph.D. from Princeton University in German literature in 1949, he taught at Harvard University, Duke University, and the University of Pennsylvania. In 1969, he entered Yale University, where he was appointed director of graduate studies and department chair. The Finnish government knighted him twice. He retired in 1995.

Among the main topics of Schoolfield's work was Finland-Swedish literature.
