= Everett Dempster =

American geneticist

Everett R. Dempster
- Born: Everett Ross Dempster; 1903; San Francisco, California, US
- Died: January 27, 1992 (aged 88–89)
- Education: University of California, Berkeley
- Known for: Quantitative genetics
- Spouse: Lauramay Tinsley (m. 1927–1992)
- Children: 2
- Scientific career
- Fields: Genetics
- Institutions: University of California, Berkeley
- Thesis: Some differential genetic effects of neutron and roentgen irradiations (1941)

Everett Ross Dempster (1903 – January 27, 1992) was an American geneticist and professor at the University of California, Berkeley, where he was chair of the Department of Genetics from 1963 to 1970.
