= Diego Durán =

16th-century Dominican friar

- Born: c. 1537; Seville, Crown of Castile
- Died: 1588 (aged 50–51); Mexico City, New Spain
- Occupation: Dominican friar
- Notable work: The History of the Indies of New Spain

Diego Durán (c. 1537 – 1588) was a Dominican friar best known for his authorship of one of the earliest Western books on the history and culture of the Aztecs, The History of the Indies of New Spain, a book that was much criticised in his lifetime for helping the "heathen" maintain their culture.

Also known as the Durán Codex, The History of the Indies of New Spain was completed in about 1581. Durán also wrote Book of the Gods and Rites (1574–1576), and Ancient Calendar (c. 1579). He was fluent in Nahuatl, the Aztec language, and was therefore able to consult natives and Aztec codices as well as work done by earlier friars. His empathetic nature allowed him to gain the confidence of many native people who would not share their stories with other Europeans, and was able to document many previously unknown folktales and legends that make his work unique.

== Early life ==
Durán was born sometime around 1537 in Seville, Spain. His family traveled to Mexico when he was about seven years old. Later he wrote "although I did not acquire my milk teeth in Texcoco, I got my second ones there."

Durán grew up in Tetzcoco (Texcoco), in the present state of Mexico, an important learning center where there had been an extensive pre-Hispanic library of books in pictorial form, now called "codices". The inhabitants of Tetzcoco spoke Nahuatl, the language of the Aztec, and the boy soon spoke it as well as his native Spanish. This served him well in his later work among the natives as a friar and as an ethnographer, interviewing Nahuatl-speaking people in rural areas.

When he was still young, his family moved to Mexico City where he attended school and was exposed to Aztec culture under the colonial rule of Spain, as well as the many Africans brought by the Spanish as slaves. According to Heyden, Durán was often puzzled by the mix of races and cultures and their significance for social class.

== Life within the Church ==
In 1556 he entered the Dominican Order and was sent to Oaxaca in 1561 after being trained in Mexico City. He resided for a time at a convent, or friary, in Oaxtepec, and there he found many informants within the Church. He is believed to have been tutored by Dominican Fray Francisco de Aguilar, who had once been a soldier involved in the siege of Tenochtitlan. Aguilar later joined the Dominican order, and had much to tell Durán about the Aztecs at first contact. He was cited frequently by Durán in his History.

Durán later became a vicar at a convent in Hueyapan and it was there that he learned the most from the native Nahuas. The convents had been issued a decree by Charles V to preach the Christian word to native rural villages and Durán ventured into the villages frequently to converse with the natives there. The clergy were to also observe native customs and to search for ancient documents particularly the lost Holy Scriptures of Saint Thomas (who was believed to have been the basis for the Aztecs' Quetzalcoatl).

He developed a close association with the people he was attempting to convert, which led him to criticize the clerics and conquistadors who never learned the natives' language, writing "they should know the language well and understand [the people] if they have any pretense of obtaining fruit. And the clergy should not acquiesce by saying they need know only enough of the tongue in order to hear confession and that is enough." (Book of the Gods and Rites) and scorns the Spaniards' crude use of the language that made the natives scoff.

Durán was torn between two worlds, his own people, and the Aztecs. On one hand, he respected the Aztecs and their governmental organization before the conquest; and he grew to admire the native people of Mexico, and often said so. On the other hand, he was repulsed by certain acts of his native informants, particularly human sacrifice. It was, after all, his duty to evangelize them, and his cultural background gave him a great disdain for such things. Another of his duties was to document the cultural ways and practices of the native people to serve as a manual for other monks in their attempt to evangelize them. Although his purpose was to detail the "heathen practices" as a manual for other missionaries, he also wanted to make it pleasant to read and useful to others.

In 1585, Durán returned to Mexico City in ill health to live and work in the Convent of St. Dominic there, as a translator from Nahuatl to Spanish for the Inquisition. He died in 1588 of an unknown illness.

== Historical works and influence ==
An excerpt from The History of the Indies of New Spain showing the founding of Tenochtitlan.

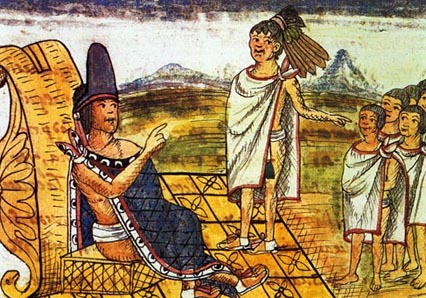
Moctezuma represented according to the codex of the 16th century chronicler Diego Durán.

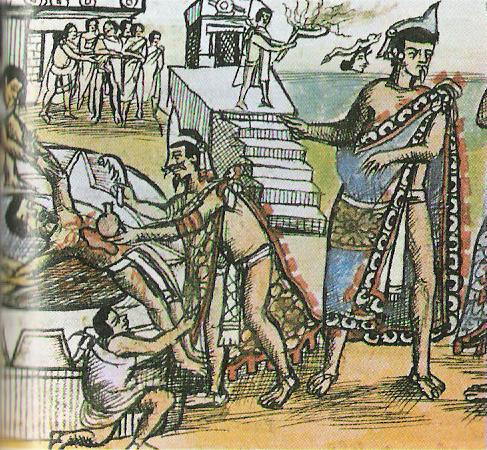
Engraving of an Aztec human sacrifice, shown in the book Historia de las Indias (1574–1576) by Diego Durán.

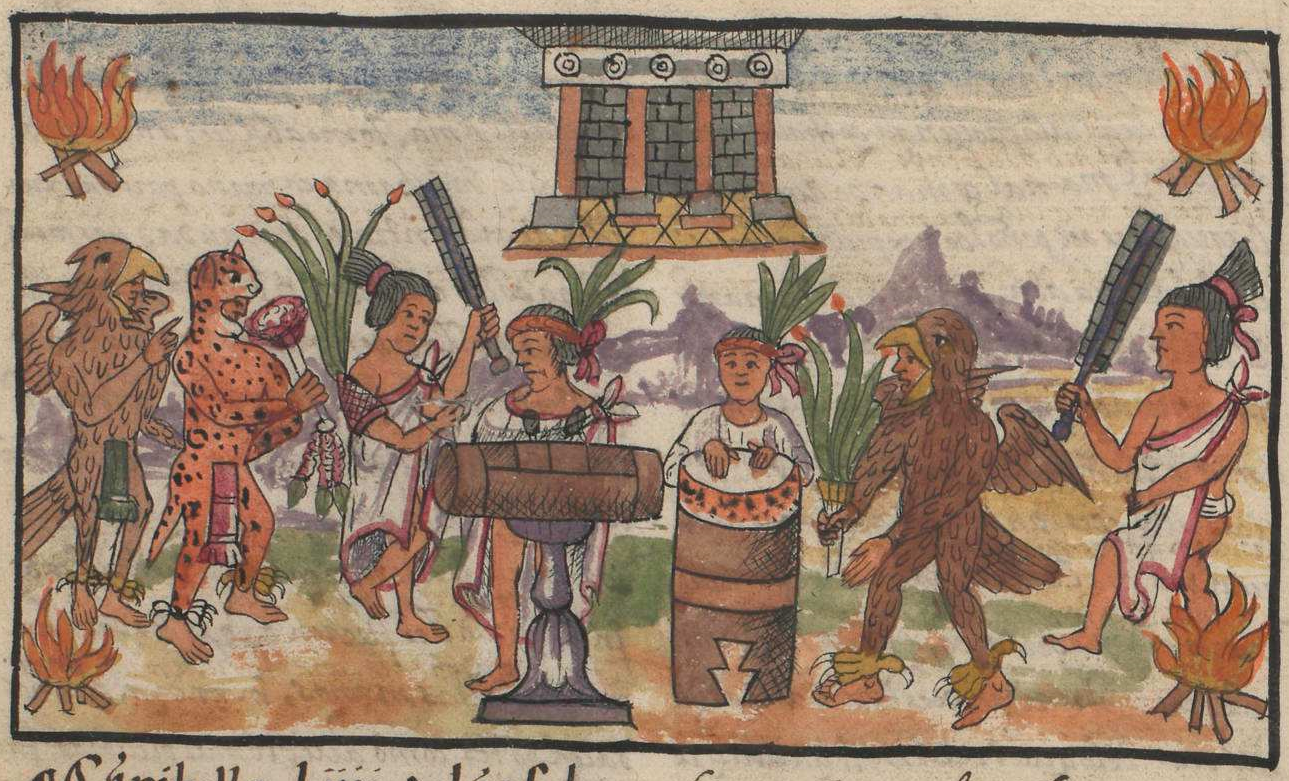
Festivities for the coronation of Moctezuma. The depicted event took place in 1502. Durán Codex, page 158.

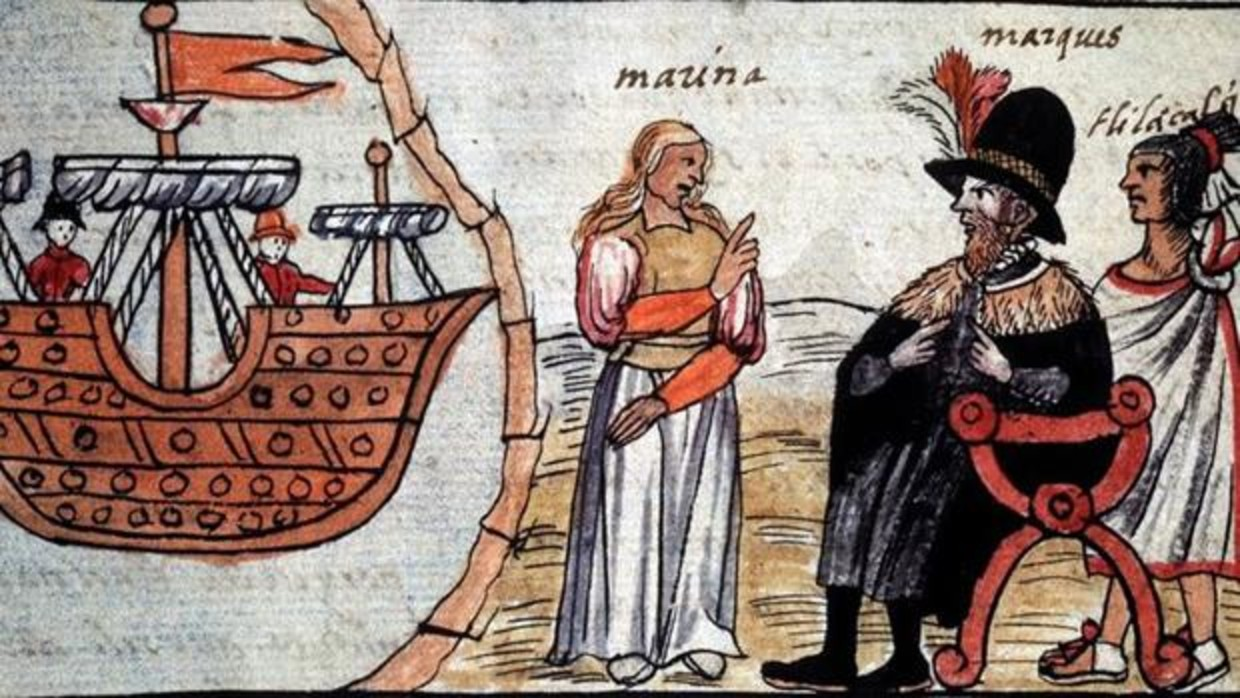
Hernán Cortés and La Malinche, 1576, Durán Codex by Diego Durán.

The History of the Indies of New Spain, sometimes referred to as the Durán Codex, contains 78 chapters spanning from the Aztec creation story until after the Spanish conquest of the Aztec Empire, and includes a chronology of Aztec emperors.

The friars of the 16th century borrowed one another's material without citation. Some scholars believe that the Durán Codex formed the basis for the Ramírez Codex although others believe that both Ramírez Codex and the Durán Codex relied on an earlier unknown work referred to as "Chronicle X". In 1596, Durán was cited as a source by Fray Agustín Dávila Padilla in his Historia de la fundación y discurso de la Provincia de Mexico.

The Durán Codex was unpublished until the 19th century, when it was found in the Library of Madrid by José Fernando Ramírez. In his Ancient Calendar, Durán explains why his work would go so long without being published by saying "some persons (and they are not a few) say that my work will revive ancient customs and rites among the Indians", to which he replied that the Indians were quite good at secretly preserving their own customs and cultures and needed no outside help.

Durán's work has become invaluable to archaeologists and others studying Mesoamerica and scholars studying Mesoamerican ethnohistory. Although there are few surviving Aztec codices written before the Spanish invasion, the more numerous post-conquest codices and near-contemporary works such as Durán's and Sahagún's are invaluable sources for the interpretation of archaeological theories and evidence, but more importantly for constructing a history of the natives from texts produced by the natives themselves, as exemplified in the New Philology.

== See also ==
- Mesoamerican Codices
- Aztec codex
- Maya codices
- Aztec
- Crónica Mexicayotl
- Nahuatl
- Dominican Order
- List of people from Morelos
- List of Spanish chroniclers of the Indies
- Mesoamerican Long Count calendar
- Mesoamerican literature
