= Tzompantli =

Rack or palisade that displays human skulls

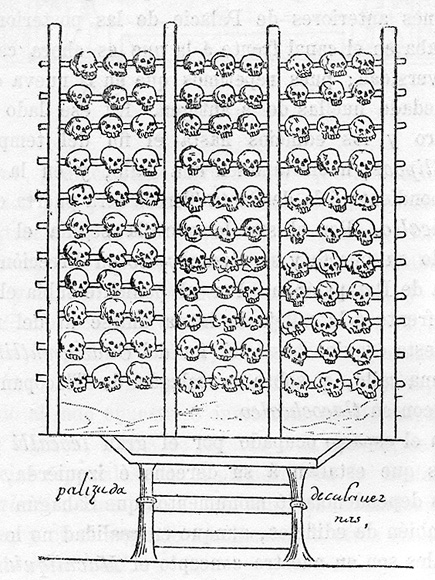
A tzompantli, illustrated in the 16th-century Aztec manuscript, the Durán Codex

A tzompantli (Nahuatl pronunciation: [t͡somˈpant͡ɬi]) or skull rack was a type of wooden rack or palisade documented in several Mesoamerican civilizations, which was used for the public display of human skulls, typically those of war captives or other sacrificial victims. It is a scaffold-like construction of poles on which heads and skulls were placed after holes had been made in them. Many have been documented throughout Mesoamerica, and range from the Epiclassic (c. 600–900 CE) through early Post-Classic (c. 900–1250 CE). In 2015 archeologists announced the discovery of the Huey Tzompantli, with more than 650 skulls, in the archeological zone of the Templo Mayor in Mexico City.

== Etymology ==
The name comes from the Classical Nahuatl language of the Aztecs but is also commonly applied to similar structures depicted in other civilizations. Its precise etymology is uncertain although its general interpretation is 'skull rack', 'wall of skulls', or 'skull banner'. It is most likely a compound of the Nahuatl words tzontecomatl ('skull'; from tzontli or tzom- 'hair', 'scalp' and tecomatl ('gourd' or 'container'), and pamitl ('banner'). That derivation has been ascribed to explain the depictions in several codices that associate these with banners; however, Nahuatl linguist Frances Karttunen has proposed that pantli means merely 'row' or 'wall'.

== Historical distribution ==
=== General information ===
It was most commonly erected as a linearly-arranged series of vertical posts connected by a series of horizontal crossbeams. The skulls were pierced or threaded laterally along these horizontal stakes. An alternate arrangement, more common in the Maya regions, was for the skulls to be impaled on top of one another along the vertical posts.

Tzompantli is known chiefly for their depiction in Late Postclassic (13th to 16th centuries) and post-Conquest (mid-16th to 17th centuries) codices, contemporary accounts of the conquistadores, and several other inscriptions. However, a tzompantli-like structure, thought to be the first instance of such structures, has been excavated from the Proto-Classic Zapotec civilization at the La Coyotera, Oaxaca site, dating from around the 2nd century BCE to the 3rd century CE. The Zapotecs called this structure a yàgabetoo, and it displayed 61 skulls.

Tzompantli are also noted in other Mesoamerican pre-Columbian cultures, such as the Toltec and Mixtec.

=== Toltec ===
At the Toltec capital of Tula the first indications in Central Mexico of a real fascination with skulls and skeletons. Tula flourished from the ninth until the thirteenth century. The site includes the decimated remains of a tzompantli. The tzompantli at Tula displayed multiple rows of stone carved skulls adorning the sides of a broad platform upon which the actual skulls of sacrificial victims were exhibited. The tzompantli appeared during the final phases of civilization at Tula, which was destroyed around 1200.

=== Maya ===
Other examples are indicated from Maya civilization sites such as Uxmal and other Puuc region sites of the Yucatán, dating from around the late 9th-century decline of the Maya Classical Era. A particularly fine and intact inscription example survives at the extensive Chichen Itza site.

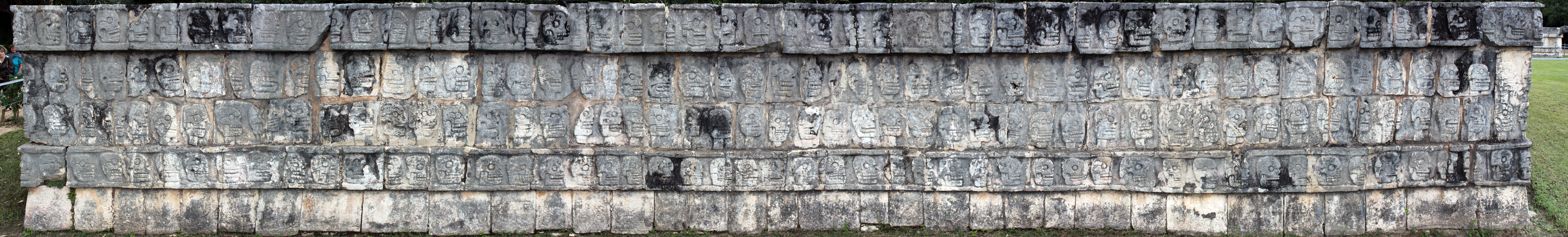
Chichén Itzá tzompantli

Human sacrifice on a large scale was introduced to the Maya by the Toltecs from the appearances of the tzompantli in the Chichen Itza ball courts. Six ball court reliefs at Chichen Itza depict the decapitation of a ball player; it seems that the losers would be beheaded and would have their skulls placed on the tzompantli.

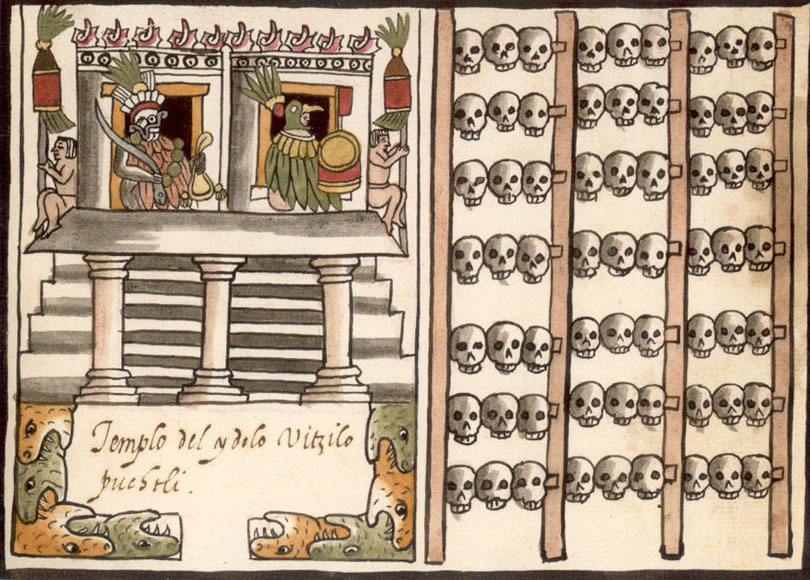
A tzompantli is illustrated to the right of a depiction of an Aztec temple dedicated to the deity Huītzilōpōchtli; from Juan de Tovar's 1587 manuscript, also known as the Tovar Codex.

=== Aztec era ===
The word tzompantli is Nahuatl and was used by the Aztecs to refer to the skull-racks found in many Aztec cities; The first and most prominent example is the Hueyi Tzompantli (Great Skull-rack) located in the Aztec capital of Tenochtitlan and described by the early conquistadors. There were at least five more skull racks in Tenochtitlan but by all accounts they were much smaller.

According to Bernal Díaz del Castillo's eye-witness account, the Historia verdadera de la conquista de la Nueva España, written several decades after the event, after Hernán Cortés's expedition was forced to make their initial retreat from Tenochtitlan, the Aztecs erected a makeshift tzompantli to display the severed heads of men and horses they had captured from the invaders. This tzompantli is depicted in the twelfth book of the Florentine Codex. This taunting is also depicted in an Aztec codex which relates the story, and the subsequent battles which led to the eventual capture of the city by the Spanish forces and their allies.

During the stay of Cortes's expedition in the Aztec capital Tenochtitlan (initially as guest-captives of the Emperor Moctezuma II, before the battle which would lead to the conquest), they reported a wooden tzompantli altar adorned with the skulls from recent sacrifices. Within the complex of the Templo Mayor itself, a relief in stucco depicted these sacrifices; the remains of this relief have survived and may now be seen in the ruins in the Zócalo of present-day Mexico City.

==== Preparation of tzompantli ====
Excavations at Templo Mayor in the Aztec capital Tenochtitlan have revealed many skulls belonging to women and children, in addition to those of men, a demonstration of the diversity of the human sacrifices in Aztec culture. While the severed heads were put on display, many scholars have determined that the limbs of Aztec victims were cannibalized. Fray Diego Durán confirms this, stating that skulls were delivered to temples after "the flesh had been eaten".

Durán notes that the tzompantli were periodically renovated. Regarding this, Durán states: "When [the skulls] become old and deteriorated, they fell in pieces. When the palisade become old, however, it was renovated, and on its removal many [skulls] broke. Others were removed to make room for more, so that there would be a place for those were to be killed later."

Archeologist Eduardo Contreras believes that the tissue attached to skulls was removed prior to a tzompantli pole being inserted through the side of the skulls. He bases these assumptions on excavations of the Plaza de las Tres Culturas at Tlatelolco, Mexico City, between 1960 and 1965.

==== Hueyi Tzompantli ====
The Hueyi Tzompantli was the central tzompantli found in Tenochtitlan. The skull rack here served as a reminder of the Aztec's ongoing Flowery Wars. An important aspect of Aztec warfare was the capture of enemy warriors to serve as sacrificial victims, which is evident from the number of warriors found sacrificed around Aztec structures. One conquistador, Andrés de Tapia, was given the task of counting the skulls on the tzompantli at Tenochtitlan and estimated that there were 136,000 skulls on it. However, based on numbers given by Taipa and Fray Diego Durán, Bernard Ortiz de Montellano has calculated that there were at most 60,000 skulls on the Hueyi Tzompantli of Tenochtitlan. The Hueyi Tzompantli consisted of a massive masonry platform composed of “thirty long steps” measuring fully 60 meters in length by 30 meters wide at its summit. Atop of the aforementioned platform was erected an equally formidable wooden palisade and scaffolding consisting of between 60 and 70 massive uprights or timbers woven together with an impressive constellation of horizontal cross beams upon which were suspended the tens of thousands of decapitated human heads once impaled thereon. Regarding this, Bernal Díaz de Castillo states:

I remember that they had in a plaza, where there were some shrines, so many places of dead skulls, which could be counted, according to the concert as they were set, that when they appeared they would be more than one hundred thousand; and I say again about one hundred thousand. And in another part of the square were as many rowers of bones without meat, bones of dead, that could not be counted; and they had in many beams many heads hanging from one part to another. And keeping those bones and skulls were three priests, who, as we understood, were in charge of them. Of which we had to look more after we entered the land well: in all the villages they were that way, and also in Tascala.

Various scholarly interpretations of the cosmological importance of Hueyi Tzompantli's placement have emerged. Eduardo Matos Moctezuma claims that a central tzompantli was placed north of the Templo Mayor. Moctezuma notes that no corresponding shrine was found south. Moctezuma also notes that Mexica views of the universe, which divide the universe into a horizontal and vertical plane, claim that the northern sector of the horizontal plane corresponds to Mictlampa, or the land of the dead. On the other hand, Rubén G. Mendoza contends that the Hueyi Tzompantli was placed on an east–west axis between the Templo Mayor and a principal ball court. The Hueyi Tzompantli would have been aligned with the marker within the Templo Mayor dividing one half for Tlāloc and the other half for Huītzilōpōchtli. Mendoza argues that as the sun traveled through the sky, it would have ascended into the "vault of the heavens", represented by the Hueyi Tzompantli.

Modern archeological evidence has found that this large palisade was flanked by two circular towers made out of skulls and mortar.

==== Historical depictions ====
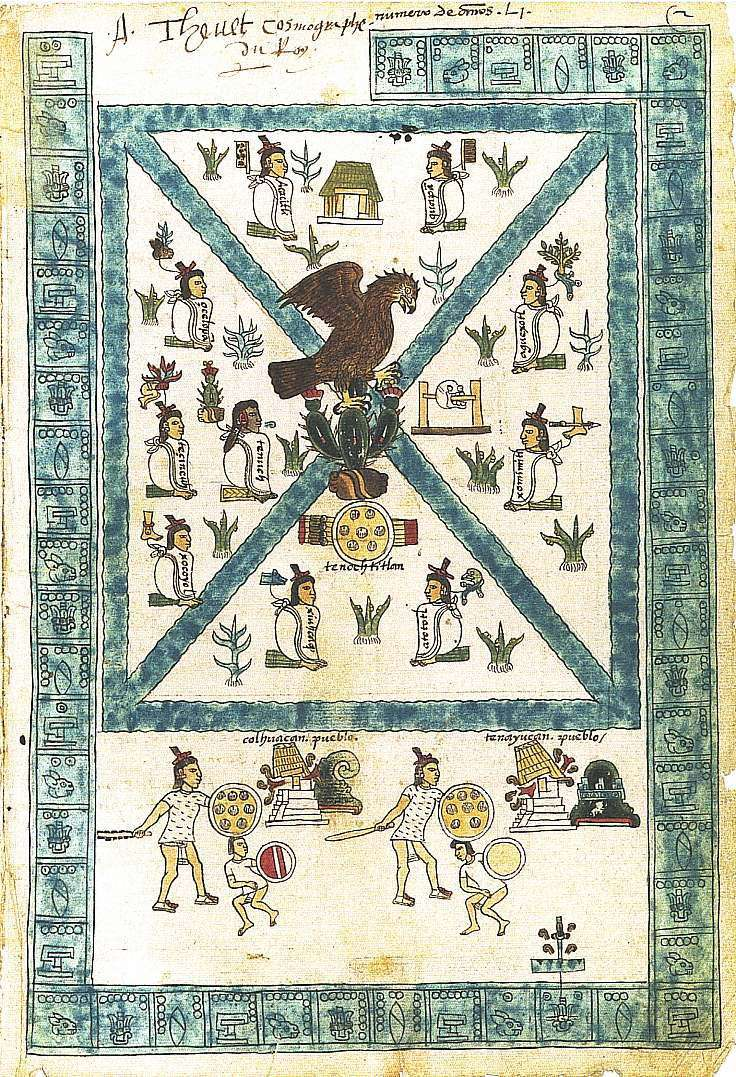
Frontispiece of the Codex Mendoza

There are numerous depictions of tzompantli in Aztec codices, dating from around the time or shortly after the Spanish conquest of the Aztec Empire, such as the Durán Codex, Ramírez Codex, and Codex Borgia. The Codex Mendoza contains multiple depictions of tzompantli. The Frontispiece of the Codex Mendoza depicts a tzompantli holding single skull next to an eagle perched on a cactus. A similar depiction of a tzompantli is used to represent the town of Tzompanco in the Codex Mendoza. Folio 45v of the Codex Borgia depicts a platform adorned with skulls.

==== Recent excavations ====
Archaeologists affiliated with the National Institute of Anthropology and History have taken part in a series of excavations since 2015 that have resulted in the finding of tzompantli. These excavations took place near the Mexico City Metropolitan Cathedral and included the finding of one tzompantli tower. These excavations have revealed that women and children were sacrificed, although men made up 75% of the sacrificial victims.

== Association and meaning ==
Apart from their use to display the skulls of ritualistically-executed war captives, tzompantli often occur in the contexts of Mesoamerican ball courts, which were widespread throughout the region's civilizations and sites. The game was 'played for keeps' ending with the losing team being sacrificed. The captain of the winning team was tasked with taking the head of the losing team's captain to be displayed on a tzompantli. In these contexts it appears that the tzompantli was used to display the losers' heads of this often highly ritualised game. Not all games resulted in this outcome, however, and for those that did it is surmised that these participants were often notable captives. An alternative theory is that it was the captain of the winning team who lost his head, but there is little evidence that this was the case. Still, it is acknowledged that in Mesoamerican culture to be sacrificed was to be honored with feeding the gods. Tula, the former Toltec capital, has a well-preserved tzompantli inscription on its ball court.

The association with ball courts is also reflected in the Popol Vuh, the famous religious, historical and cultural account of the K'iche' Maya. When Hun Hunahpu, father of the Maya Hero Twins, was killed by the lords of the Underworld (Xibalba), his head was hung in a gourd tree next to a ball court. The gourd tree is a clear representation of a tzompantli, and the image of skulls in trees as if they were fruits is also a common indicator of a tzompantli and the associations with some of the game's metaphorical interpretations.

== Gallery ==
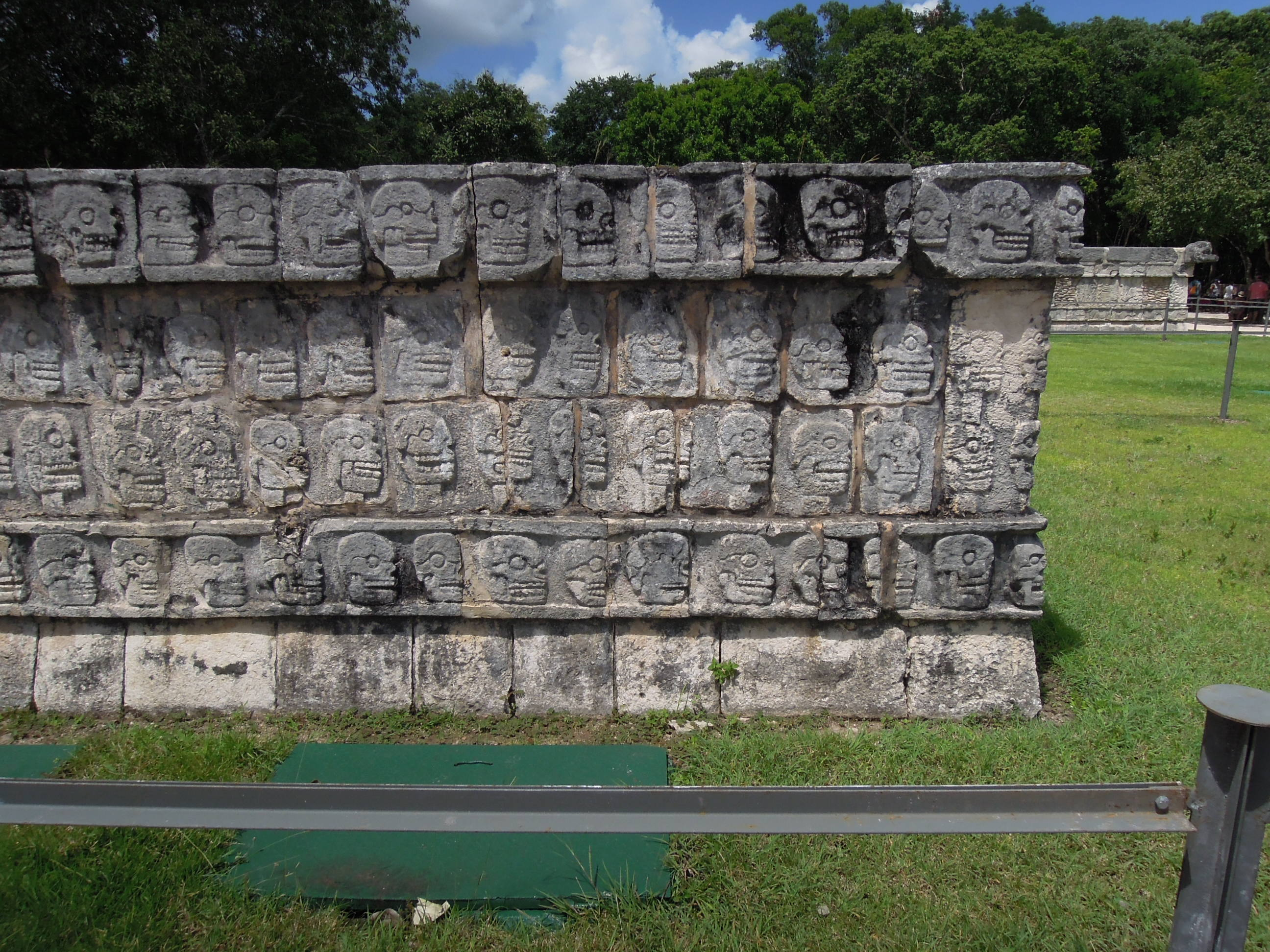
Detail of tzompantli at Chichen Itza

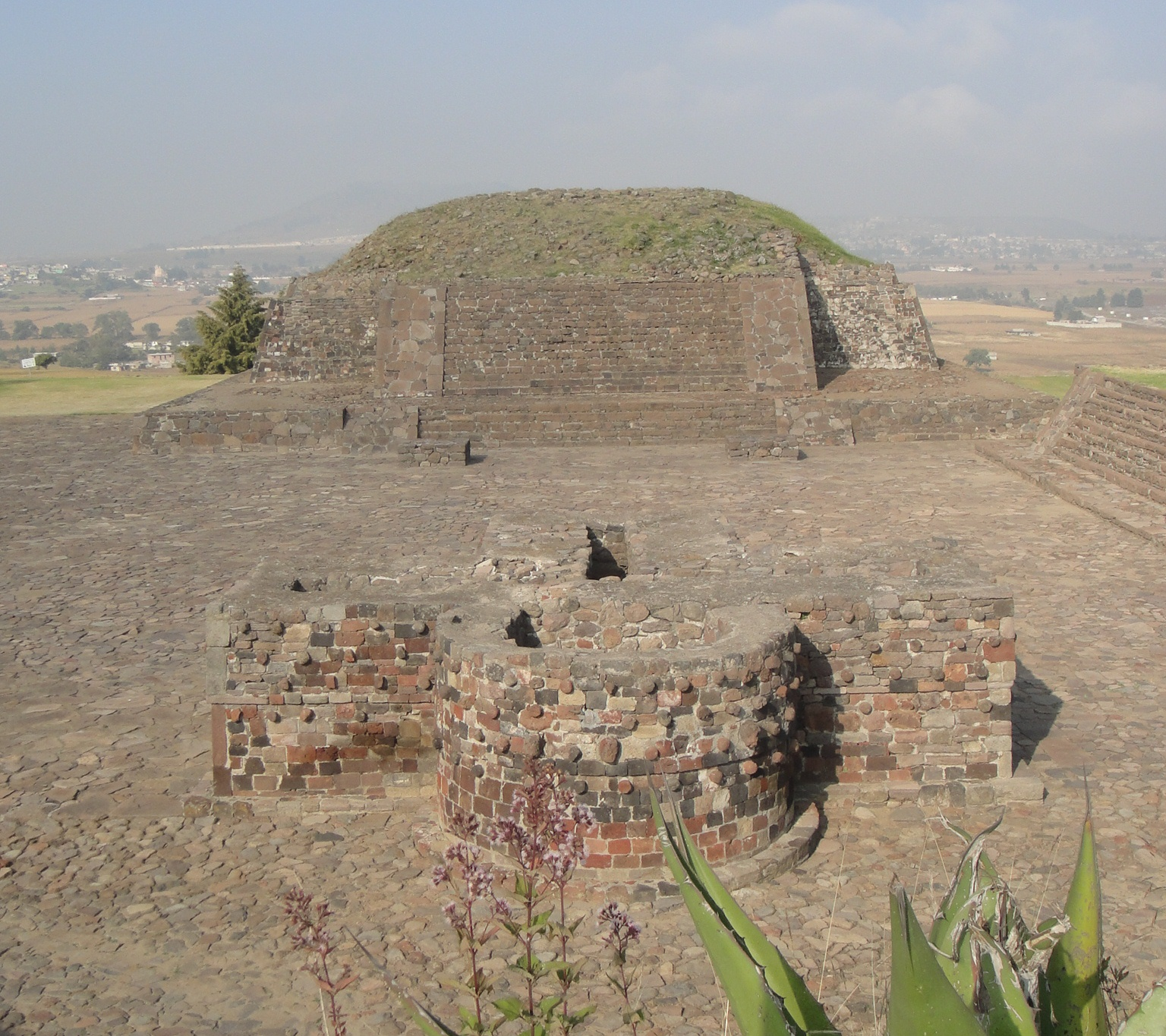
Tzompantli found at Monument Four of Calixtlahuaca

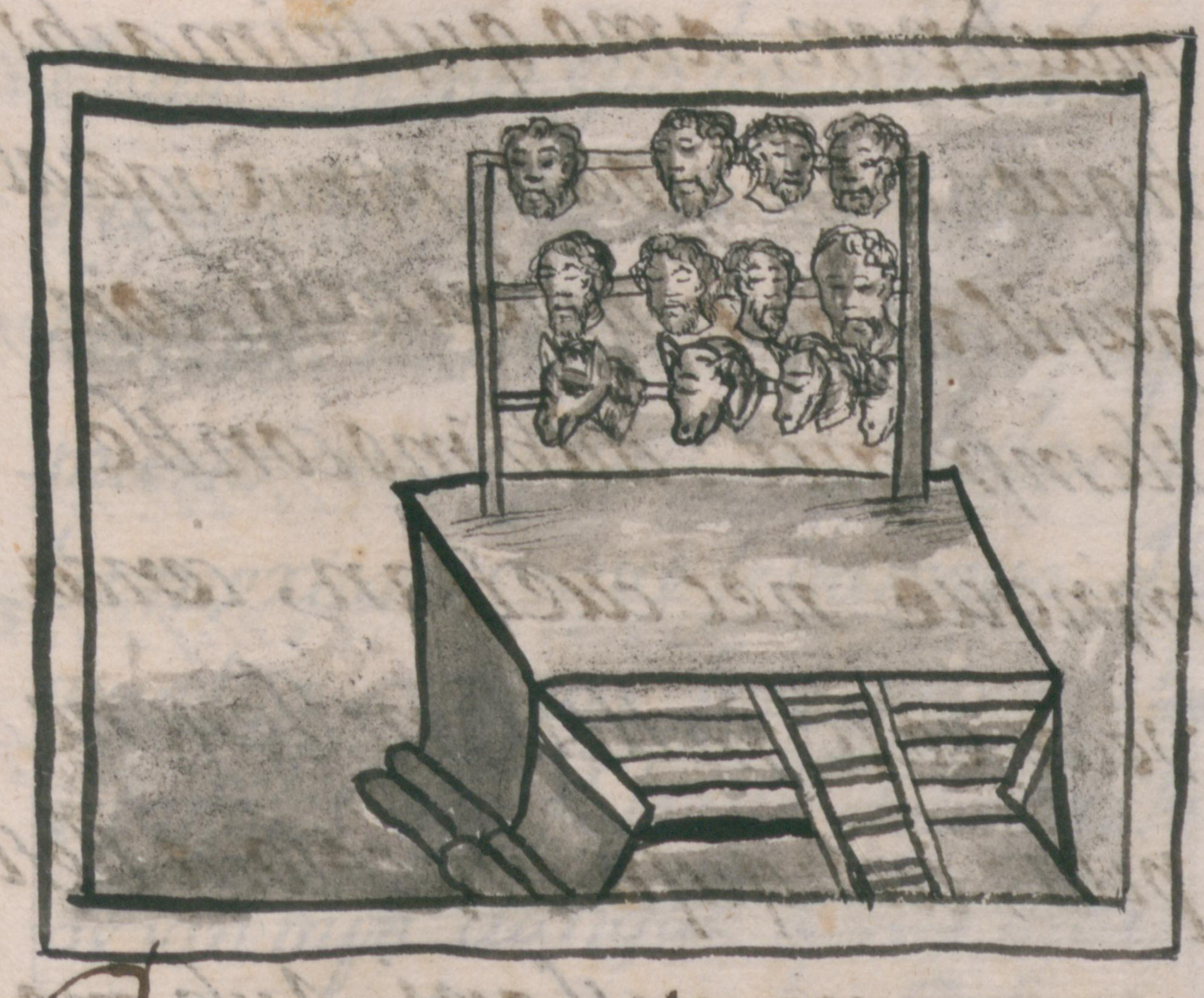
The Twelfth Book of the Florentine Codex shows the heads of captured Spanish soldiers and their horses displayed on a tzompantli in front of the Temple of Huitzilopochtli.

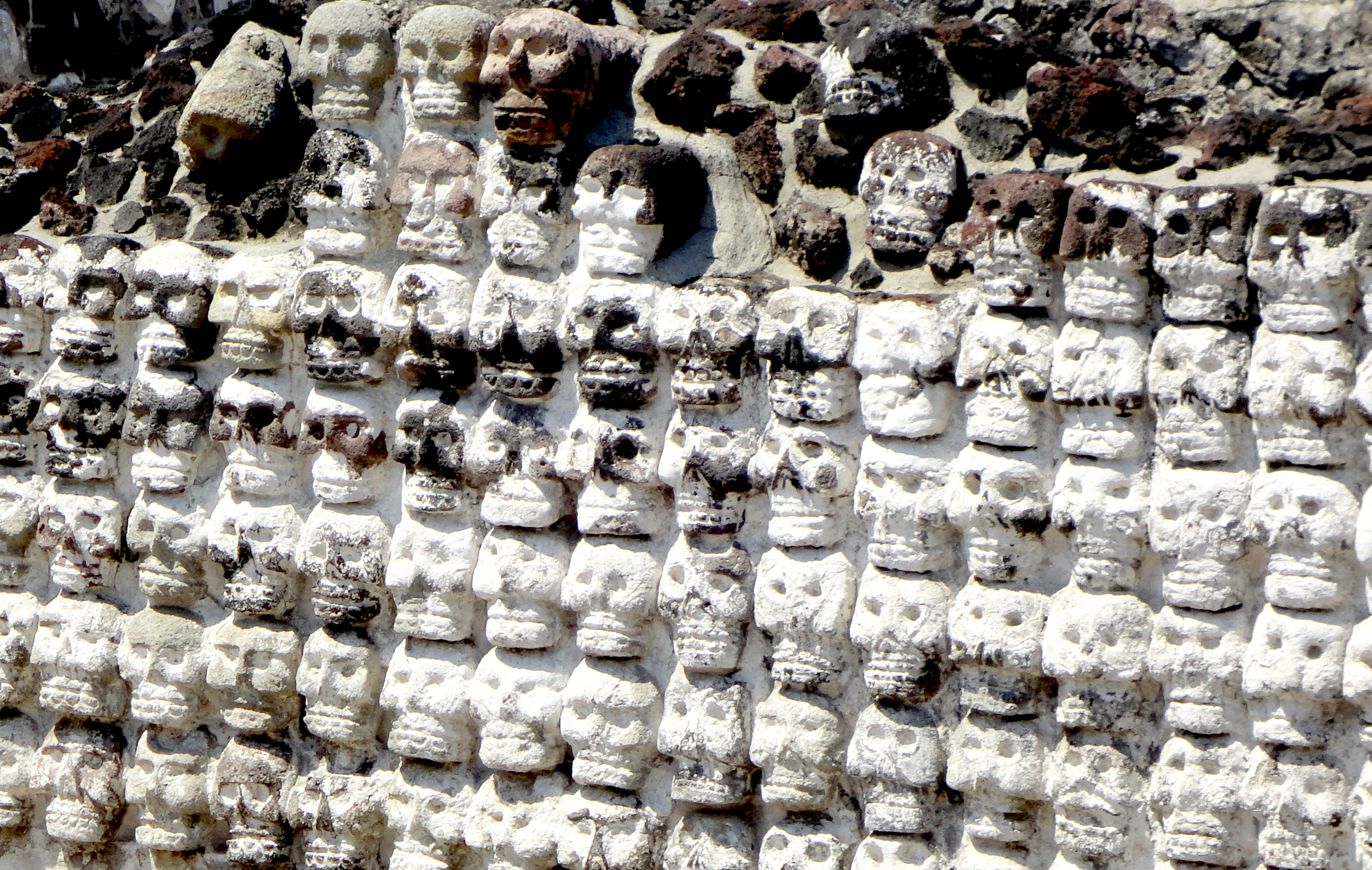
An excavated tzompantli from the Templo Mayor in modern-day Mexico City

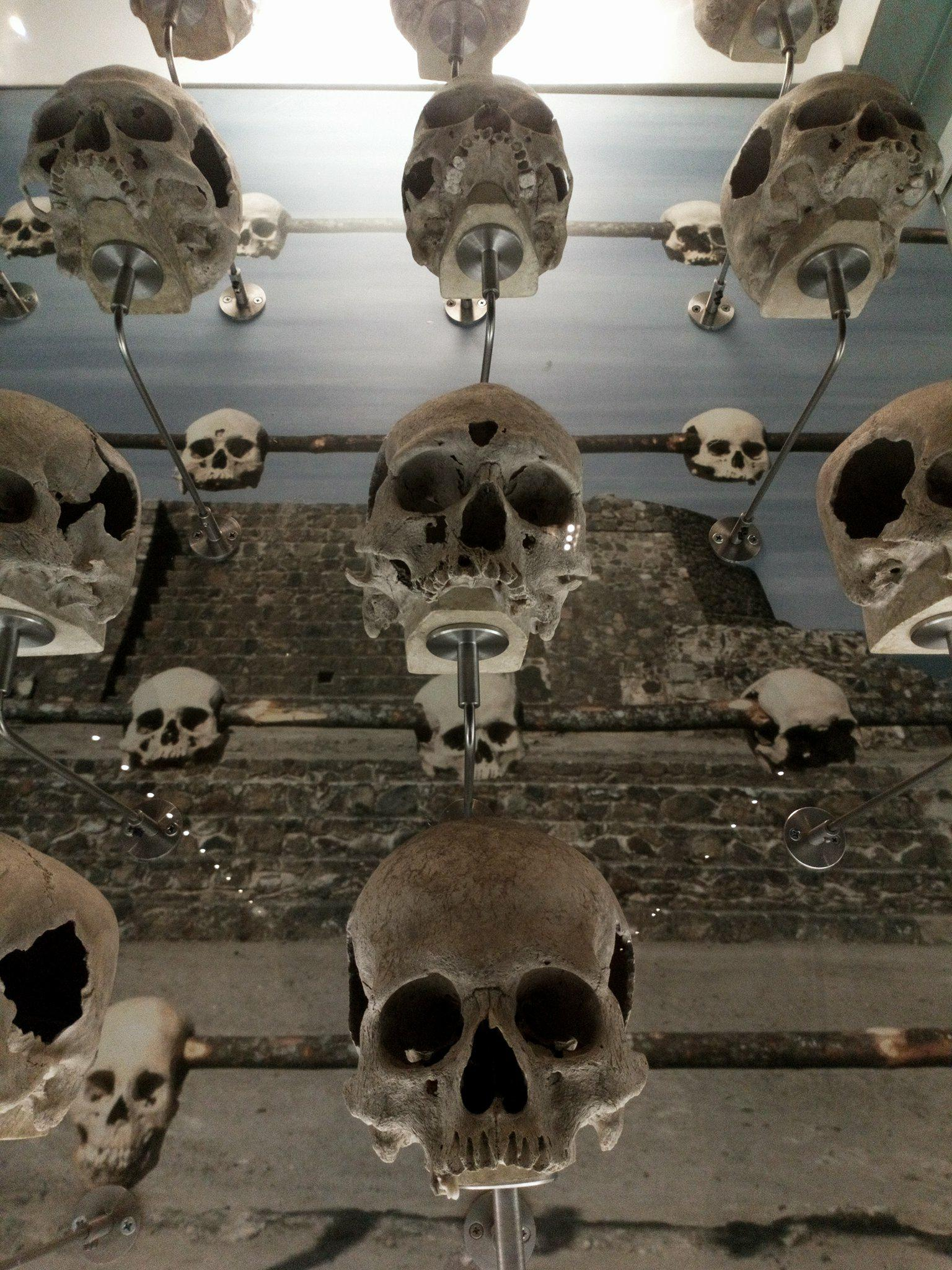
Replica of a tzompantli in the Museo Nacional de Historia in Mexico City

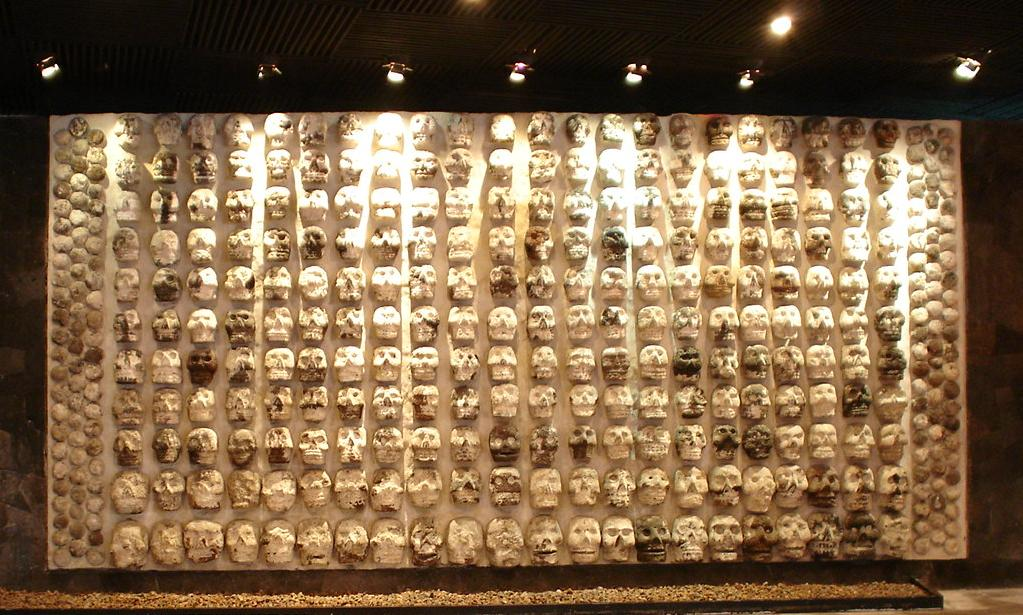
Tzompantli at the Museum of the Templo Mayor.

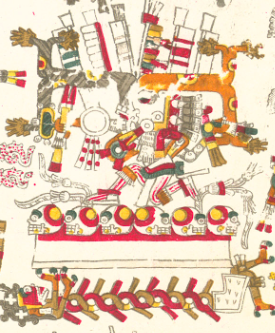
Tzompantli as depicted in Codex Borgia

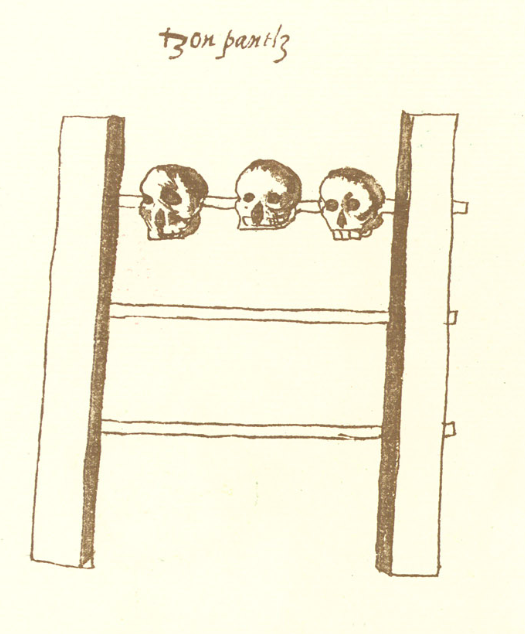
Tzompantli in Codex Vaticanus 3778, a facsimile of the Codex Ríos

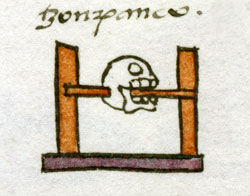
A simplified tzompantli represents the town of Tzompanco in the Codex Mendoza

== Contemporary uses ==
Tzompantli have been the subject of multiple artworks created during the twentieth century. Jose Chavez Morado depicted tzompantli in a 1961 painting. George O. Jackson, as part of his Essence of Mexico project, photographed various representations of skulls, which he refers to as calaveras (the Spanish word for 'skulls'); Jackson refers to groups of these photos as tzompantli. Tzompantli were also the subject of murals created for the festival Mextonia, which celebrates Mexican culture and occurs in Estonia, by the art collective Nueve Arte Urbano. The Museo de Arte de Querétaro featured an exhibit titled Tzompantli, which featured works made by various artists depicting skulls.

=== In popular culture ===
In Charles Stross's Laundry Files novels, the new prime minister of the United Kingdom adds a tzompantli to the Marble Arch.

== See also ==
- Capela dos Ossos
- Headhunting
- Santa Maria della Concezione dei Cappuccini
- Sedlec Ossuary
- Skull Chapel, Czermna
- Skull Tower

== Bibliography ==
- Brandes, Stanley (2009). Skulls to the Living, Bread to the Dead: The Day of the Dead in Mexico and Beyond. Hoboken: John Wiley & Sons. ISBN 9781405178709.
- Campbell, Joseph (1988). The Power of Myth. New York: Doubleday. ISBN 978-0385418867.
- Coe, Michael D.; Koontz, Rex (2008). Mexico: From the Olmecs to the Aztecs. New York: Thames and Hudson. ISBN 978-0-500-28755-2.
- Coe, Michael D. (2011). The Maya. New York: Thames and Hudson. ISBN 978-0-500-28902-0.
- Diaz del Castillo, Bernal (1963). Historia verdadera de la conquista de la Nueva España [The Conquest of New Spain]. Translated by J. M. Cohen. New York: Penguin Group. ISBN 978-0140441239.
- Flannery, Kent V.; Marcus, Joyce (July 2003). "The origin of war: New 14C dates from ancient Mexico". PNAS. 100 (20): 11801–11805. Bibcode:2003PNAS..10011801F. doi:10.1073/pnas.1934526100. PMC 208841. PMID 14500785.
- Harner, Michael (February 1977). "The Ecological Basis for Aztec Sacrifice". American Ethnologist. 4 (1): 117–135. doi:10.1525/ae.1977.4.1.02a00070. JSTOR 643526.
- Levy, Buddy (2009). Conquistador: Hernán Cortés, King Montezuma, and the Last Stand of the Aztecs. New York: Random House LLC. ISBN 9780553384710.
- Mendoza, Ruben G. (2007). "The Divine Gourd Tree". In Chacon, Richard J.; Dye, David H. (eds.). The Taking and Displaying of Human Body Parts as Trophies by Amerindians. Interdisciplinary Contributions to Archaeology. New York: Springer Press. pp. 400–443. doi:10.1007/978-0-387-48303-0_16. ISBN 978-0-387-48300-9.
- Miller, Mary; Taube, Karl (1993). The Gods and Symbols of Ancient Mexico and the Maya. London: Thames and Hudson. ISBN 978-0-500-05068-2.
- Nelson, Ben A.; Darling, J. Andrew; Kice, David A. (December 1992). "Mortuary Practices and the Social Order at La Quemada, Zacatecas, Mexico". Latin American Antiquity. 3 (4): 298–315. doi:10.2307/971951. JSTOR 971951. S2CID 163819183.
- Ortíz de Montellano, Bernard R. (1983). "Counting Skulls: Comment on the Aztec Cannibalism Theory of Harner-Harris". American Anthropologist. 85 (2): 403–406. doi:10.1525/aa.1983.85.2.02a00130.
- Palka, Joel W. (2007). Historical Dictionary of Mesoamerica. Lanham: Scarecrow Press. ISBN 978-0810837157.
- Spencer, C. S. (1982). The Cuicatlán Cañada and Monte Albán: A Study of Primary State Formation. New York: Academic Press. ISBN 978-0-12-656680-2.
