= Susan Schroeder =

American historian

Susan Schroeder (born 1939) is an American historian, specializing in the ethnohistory of Aztec people of Mexico and in the translation of colonial documents written in Nahuatl - especially the chronicles of Chimalpahin. She received her PhD in 1984 from UCLA where she studied Nahuatl and Latin American colonial history with James Lockhart. She is professor emerita at Tulane University, where she taught from 1999 to 2009, after teaching at Loyola University at Chicago from 1985 to 1999. She received the lifetime achievement award of the American Society for Ethnohistory in 2017.

== Major publications ==
- 2009. The Conquest All Over Again: Nahuas and Zapotecs Thinking, Writing, and Painting Spanish Colonialism. Editor, with David Cahill. Sussex: Sussex Academic Press.
- 2000. “Jesuits, Nahuas, and the Good Death Society in Mexico City, 1710-1767.” Hispanic American Historical Review. 80 (1).
- 1998. “The First American Valentine: Nahua Courtship and Other Aspects of Family Structuring in Mesoamerica.” Journal of Family History. 23 (4): 341-354.
- 1997-2005. Codex Chimalpahin. 6 vols. Translator and editor, with Arthur J. O. Anderson (Vol. 1 and 2), James Lockhart and Doris Namala (Vol. 3), and Anne J. Cruz et al. (vol. 6). Norman: University of Oklahoma Press.
- 1992. Chimalpahin and the Kingdoms of Chalco. Tucson: University of Arizona Press.

== See also ==
- New Philology
- Aztec codices
