= Pocho =

Pejorative term

Pocho (feminine: pocha) is a pejorative term in Mexican Spanish that refers to Mexican Americans.

== Definition ==
The term originally referred to fruit that was spoiled or rotten, as well as to plants and individuals that appeared to be in poor health.

Earl Shorris, an American writer and critic, defined pochos as Americans of Mexican descent "who [had] traded [their] language and culture for the illusory blandishments of life in the United States". He further observed that they were "doubly-marginalized": denied equal treatment by their birth country and regarded as inferior by their ancestral nation.

The pocho lives on the cultural and racial line ... utterly unprotected, [and] despised on every side: too Mexican for the Anglos and too agringado (assimilated into America) for the Mexicans.

In addition to Americans of Mexican descent, pocho is also used colloquially in Mexico in reference to Mexicans who have emigrated and are perceived to have excessively adopted the customs of their adopted countries. In both uses, lack of fluency in the Spanish language is considered characteristic of pochos.

Identifiable traits of this lack of fluency include reliance on code-switching, English loanwords, and generally speaking Spanish in the manner stereotypically associated with foreigners. According to El Heraldo de Chihuahua, pochos are looked upon in Mexico "with a mixture of curiosity and contempt". Rodolfo de la Garza, an American political scientist, said that when he requested a job interview from the Mexican government in 1971, he was denied by officials who told him that he "was a traitor to Mexico and ... not really a Mexican".

Historically, Mexican-born pochos who had become naturalized American citizens were viewed in Mexico as "collaborators with the enemy". The American novelist Richard Rodriguez recalled that when his father applied for American citizenship, he kept it a secret from his friends. "American citizenship would have seemed a betrayal of Mexico, a sin against memory", Rodriguez said.

== History ==
The term pocho in reference to diaspora Mexicans and their children began to be popularized in the 1940s. Increased use of the term reflected widespread disdain for this group in Mexico. For much of the 20th century, the country's sustained economic prosperity and engagement with third-worldism drove a mood of national self-confidence that limited interaction with American politics and culture. At the same time, concern over official scrutiny from the United States discouraged the Mexican government from closer involvement with matters relating to its diaspora community and their children. Mexicans in the United States, as a result, were largely politically disenfranchised from their homeland.

Intellectuals and linguistic conservatives in Mexico strongly opposed the Spanish usage associated with pochos; they organized a week-long event in August 1944 to discourage Mexicans from employing pochismos. Nevertheless, by 1946 pochismos, particularly in writings about baseball, were increasingly used by newspapers such as Excélsior in Mexico and La Opinión in Los Angeles. United States Border Patrol agents were also provided with vocabulary lists that included pochismos because they "are often used on the Mexican border and the officer will get better results if he understands".

== Legacy and criticism ==
In an essay published in El Nuevo Sol in 2014, the journalist Nancy Oy recalled first hearing the word pocha used in reference to her by her grandmother. It was not until she attended junior high school that she learned the significance of the term, whereupon she said she felt humiliated at being mocked by her own family:

The connotation of that word pocho sounded negative to me. That word makes one feel as if they have no identity of their own because one does not know how to identify themselves: whether as American or Mexican.

Andres Gallegos, in a 2018 essay for Borderzine, described the experience of being labeled pocho as that of "juggling identities". When he heard himself described as such by his Mexican friends, he understood it as signifying that he was "not Mexican enough".

An opinion piece published in 2016 by the Washington Post blamed nativist policies for "creating generations of non-Spanish speaking Latinos".

In 2023, Mexican social media users labeled the regional Mexican band, Yahritza y su Esencia, as pochos in response to an interview they gave wherein they stated their dislike of Mexican food.

== See also ==
- Chicano
- Pochano
- Pachuco
