= Shorris =

Shorris is a surname. Notable persons with that name include:

- Anthony Shorris (born 1957), American civil servant and educator
- Earl Shorris (1936–2012), American writer and social critic
