= Codex Totomixtlahuaca =

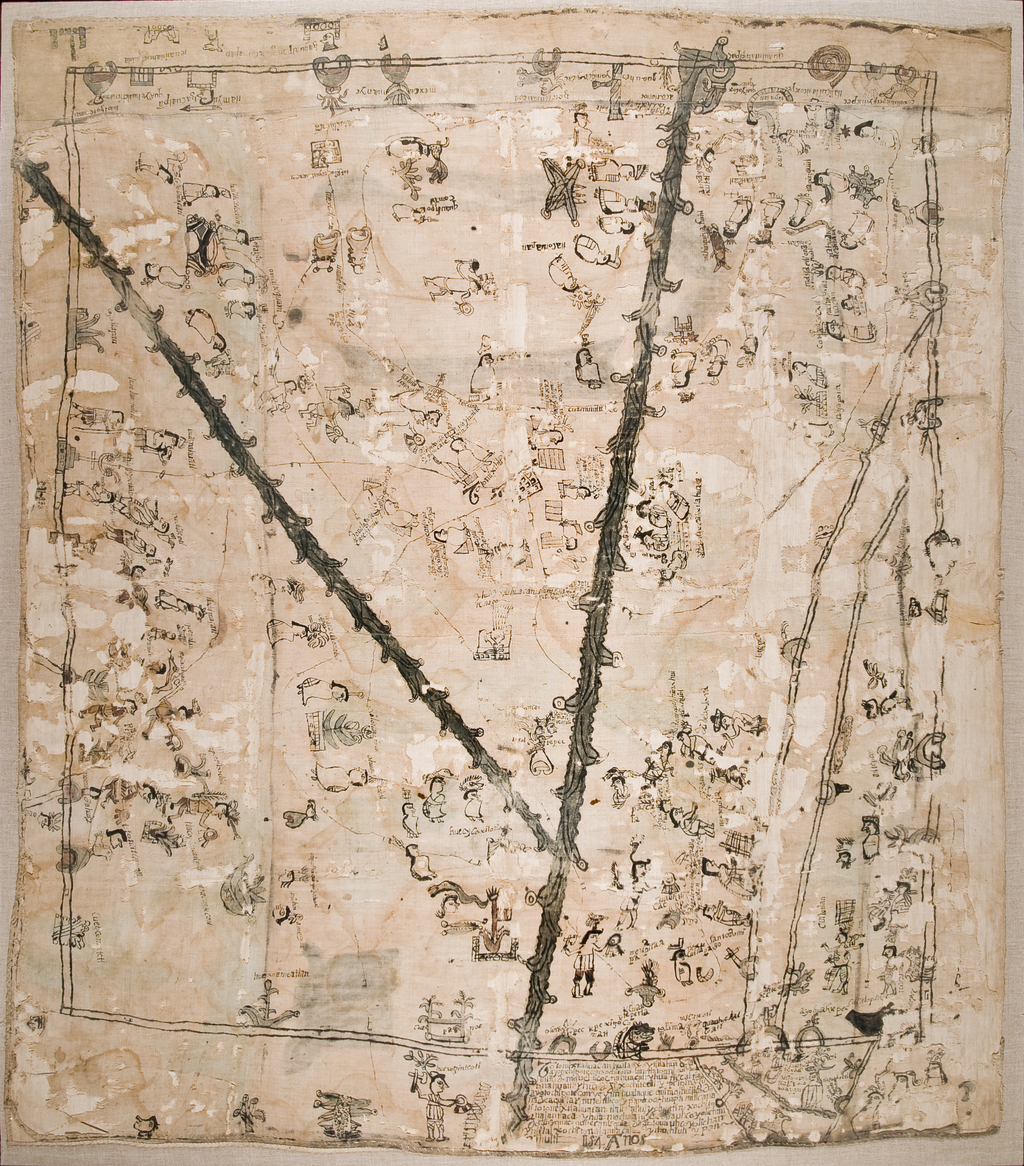
Codex Totomixtlahuaca

The Codex Totomixtlahuaca or Codex Condumex is a colonial-era map produced on a large piece of cotton. The map represents Totomixlahuaca, Mexico, and includes a creation date of 1564. It documents a meeting over a land conflict in communities of the current Mexican state of Guerrero.

== Description ==
The Codex Totomixtlahuaca was found in the community of Totomixtlahuaca, located in the southeast of Guerrero, in Mexico. Using Aztec pictographs, the map represents the distribution of lands in 1564.

== Preparation ==
The map was drawn on a large piece of cotton, roughly 217 cm by 185 cm. It was painted with coal.

== See also ==
- Mesoamerican literature
