= Miguel León-Portilla =

Mexican anthropologist and historian (1926–2019)

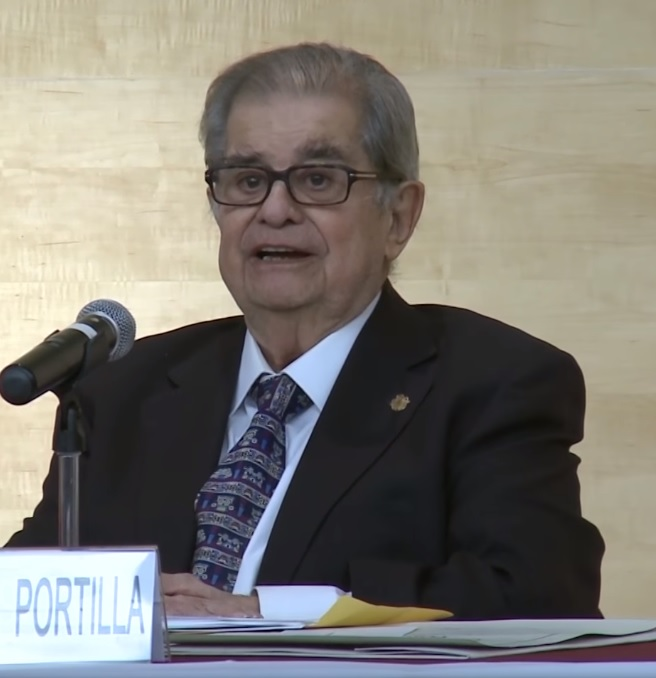
- Born: 22 February 1926; Mexico City, Mexico
- Died: 1 October 2019 (aged 93); Mexico City, Mexico
- Occupations: Philosopher, anthropologist, historian
- Spouse: Ascensión Hernández Triviño (m. 1965)
- Children: 1
- Awards: National Prize for Arts and Sciences (1981); Member of the National Academy Sciences (1995); Belisario Domínguez Medal of Honor (1995); Living Legend Award (2013)

Miguel León-Portilla (22 February 1926 – 1 October 2019) was a Mexican anthropologist and historian, specializing in Aztec culture and literature of the pre-Columbian and colonial eras. Many of his works were translated to English and he was a well-recognized scholar internationally. In 2013, the Library of Congress of the United States bestowed on him the Living Legend Award.

== Early life and education ==
Born in Guadalajara, Miguel León-Portilla had an interest in indigenous Mexico from an early age, fostered by his uncle Manuel Gamio, a distinguished archeologist. Gamio had a lasting influence on his life and career, initially taking him as a boy on trips to important archeological sites in Mexico and later as well. León-Portilla attended the Instituto de Ciencias in Guadalajara and then earned a B.A. (1948) and M.A. summa cum laude (1951) at the Jesuit Loyola University in Los Angeles. Returning to Mexico in 1952, he showed Gamio a play he had written on Quetzalcoatl, which resulted in Gamio introducing his nephew to Ángel Garibay K., whose publications in the 1930s and 1940s first brought Nahuatl literature to widespread public attention in Mexico. Needing to make a living, León-Portilla began attending law school and worked at a financial firm. At the same time he taught at Mexico City College, an English-language school in the Condesa neighborhood. Other instructors included important scholars of Mexican indigenous history and culture, Wigberto Jiménez Moreno, Fernando Horcasitas, and Eduardo Noguera. Gamio persuaded León-Portilla to drop his law studies and job in business to work at the Inter-American Indian Institute, a specialized organization of the Organization of American States, which Gamio directed. León-Portilla began graduate studies at the UNAM, completing his doctoral dissertation, La Filosofía Náhuatl estudiada en sus fuentes, in 1956, which launched his scholarly career.

== Career ==
His dissertation on Nahua philosophy was published in Mexico, and then translated to English as Aztec Thought and Culture: A Study of the Ancient Nahuatl Mind (1967) and then many other languages. It was the first of his many works to be translated to English. His translations of Nahuatl and Spanish texts on the conquest of Mexico, first published in Mexico as Visión de los vencidos, translated to English as The Broken Spears, is the way many undergraduate students in the United States are introduced to accounts from indigenous participants and not Spanish conquistadors.

León-Portilla spearheaded a movement to understand and re-evaluate Nahuatl literature and religion, not only from the pre-Columbian era, but also that of the present day, especially since Nahuatl is still spoken by 1.5 million people. His works in English on literature included Pre-Columbian Literatures of Mexico (1986), Fifteen Poets of the Aztec World (2000), and with Earl Shorris, In the Language of Kings: An Anthology of Mesoamerican Literature, Pre-Columbian to the Present (2002). He also compared the literature of the Nahuas with that of the Inca. Another area of research was on indigenous religion and spirituality, with works including Native Meso-American Spirituality (1980), and South and Meso-American Native Spirituality: From the Cult of the Feathered Serpent to the Theology of Liberation (1997). He also published a work on the Maya, Time and Reality in the Thought of the Maya (1990).

León-Portilla was instrumental in bringing to light the works of Franciscan Fr. Bernardino de Sahagún, a 16th-century primary source on the Aztec civilization, whose twelve-volume General History of the Things of New Spain, often referred to as the Florentine Codex, are crucial for understanding Nahua religion, society, and culture, as well as for providing an account of the conquest of Mexico from the Mexica viewpoint. León-Portilla was the first to denote Sahagún as the "Father of Anthropology in the New World".

He contributed to the understanding of the development of the field of Mesoamerican history in Mexico. With Garibay, León-Portilla made contributions to the study of nineteenth-century Mesoamerican historian Manuel Orozco y Berra. León-Portilla also published two volumes on the work of Mesoamerican humanists, including his mentor Garibay.

In the field of colonial Nahuatl studies, particularly the New Philology, León-Portilla's work on a collection of late sixteenth-century wills in Nahuatl, The Testaments of Culhuacan, contributed to the understanding of local-level interactions within a Nahua town.

A subordinate but important interest of León-Portilla was the early history and ethnography of the Baja California Peninsula. He addressed this region in more than 30 books and articles, including a 1995 volume collecting several of his earlier publications.

== Awards ==
Early in his academic career in 1969, he was awarded a Guggenheim Fellowship. That was the first of many academic awards and recognitions, including the Belisario Domínguez Medal of Honor, the highest award bestowed by the Mexican Senate. In 1970, he was elected to membership of Mexico's National College and, in 1995, to membership of the United States National Academy of Sciences. In 1981 he was awarded the National Prize for Arts and Sciences by the Mexican Government. From 1987 to 1992, he served as his country's permanent delegate to UNESCO, during which time he successfully nominated five pre-Columbian sites in Mexico for inclusion on the World Heritage List. On 12 December 2013, León-Portilla received the Living Legend Award from the U.S. Library of Congress. He was also a member of the Mexican Academy of Language and the Mexican Academy of History.

== Personal life ==
León-Portilla married Ascensión Hernández Triviño, a Spanish linguist and academic, in 1965. Their daughter, Marisa León-Portilla, is also a historian.

León-Portilla died in Mexico City on 1 October 2019 after having been hospitalized for much of the year. The federal Secretariat of Culture announced that his body would lie in state on 3 October 2019 at the Palacio de Bellas Artes.

== Notable works ==
León-Portilla wrote more than a 150 articles and more than forty books. A select list is below.

- La filosofía náhuatl estudiada en sus fuentes (In English: The Nahuatl Philosophy studied in its sources; 1956). Based on his doctoral dissertation, it has been edited at least ten times, and it also has been translated to English, Italian, Russian and German. León-Portilla explained that, the Mexica Tribes, didn't have a proper form of "philosophy" as known in the modern world, their tlamatinimê (Nahuatl sages) attempted to comprehend the world, asking themselves questions and searching about it. León-Portilla stated that, what Europeans understood as many gods, Aztecs, in fact perceived those many gods as a single entity called Ometeotl/Omecihuatl (Our Lord/Our Lady of Duality). This thesis was later extended in "Pensamiento y cultura azteca: estudio de la mente antigua náhuatl" (In English: Aztec Thought and Culture: Study of the Ancient Nahuatl Mind)
- Siete ensayos sobre cultura náhuatl (In English: Seven Essays about Nahuatl Culture; 1958)
- Visión de los vencidos (In English: The Broken Spears; 1959). His most popular and famous work until 2008 has been published twenty-nine times and translated into a dozen languages. In this short book, León-Portilla brings together several fragments of the Nahuatl vision of the Spanish conquest, from Moctezuma's premonitions to the sad songs (icnocuicatl) after the conquest. On 25 June 2009, the fiftieth anniversary of its first edition was celebrated in an event organized by the National Council for Culture and the Arts, the National Institute of Anthropology and History, the National Autonomous University of Mexico and the National College
- Los antiguos mexicanos a través de sus crónicas y cantares (In English: The Ancient Mexicans through their Chronicles and Songs; 1961)
- El reverso de la conquista. Relaciones aztecas, mayas e incas (In English: The reverse of the conquest. Aztec, Mayan and Inca Relations; 1964)
- Tiempo y realidad en el pensamiento Maya (In English: Time and Reality in the Thought of the Maya; 1968)
- México-Tenochtitlan, su espacio y tiempos sagrados (In English: Mexico-Tenochtitlan, its sacred space and times; 1979)
- La multilingüe toponimia de México: sus estratos milenarios. (In English: The multilingual toponymy of Mexico: its millenary strata; 1979)
- Hernán Cortés y la Mar del Sur (In English: Hernán Cortés and the South Sea; 1985)
- Cartografía y crónicas de la Antigua California (In English: Cartography and Chronicles of Ancient California; 1989)
- Quince poetas del mundo náhuatl (In English: Fifteen poets of the Nahuatl world; 1993)
- La filosofía náhuatl estudiada en sus fuentes (In English: Nahuatl philosophy studied in its sources; 1993)
- Francisco Tenamaztle (1995)
- La flecha en el blanco (In English: The arrow in the Target; 1996)
- Bernardino de Sahagún, pionero de la antropología (In English: Bernardino de Sahagún, pioneer of anthropology; 1999)
- Erótica Náhuatl (In English: Nahuatl Erotics; 2019)
- Los Testamentos de Culhuacán: Vida y Muerte entre los Nahuas del México Central, siglo XVI. Editado por Miguel León-Portilla y Sarah Cline, con la colaboración de Juan Carlos Torres López. México: Universidad Iberoamericana 2023 ISBN 978-607-417-967-5 digital, open access publication

Preceded by Jaime Sabines Gutiérrez	Belisario Domínguez Medal of Honor; 1995	Succeeded by Griselda Alvarez Ponce de León
