= James Lockhart (historian) =

American historian of colonial Spanish America

James Lockhart (April 8, 1933 - January 17, 2014) was a U.S. historian of colonial Spanish America, especially the Nahua people and Nahuatl language.

Born in Huntington, West Virginia, Lockhart attended West Virginia University (BA, 1956) and the University of Wisconsin–Madison (MA, 1962; PhD, 1967). Late in life, Lockhart wrote a short, candid memoir. He joined the US Army and was posted to Germany, working in "a low-level intelligence agency," translating letters from East Germany. Returning to the US, he entered the graduate program at University of Wisconsin, where he pursued his doctorate in the social history of conquest-era Peru.

His dissertation, published in 1968 as Spanish Peru, 1532-1560: A Social History was a path breaking approach to this early period. Less interested in the complicated political events of the era, he focused on the formation of Spanish colonial society in the midst of Spanish war with the indigenous and internecine struggles between factions of conquerors. With separate chapters on different social groups, including Africans and indigenous brought into the Spanish sphere, and an important chapter on women of the conquest era, his work shifted the understanding of that era. His main source for the people and processes of this early period were notarial documents, often property transfers and other types of legal agreements, which gave insight into the formation and function of Spanish colonial society. The work is now a classic and was published in a second, revised edition in 1994.

While researching Spanish Peru, he compiled information on the Spaniards who received a share of the ransom of the Inca Atahualpa, extracted at Cajamarca. The Men of Cajamarca has both individual biographies of those who shared in the treasure, as well as a thorough analysis of the general social patterns of those conquerors. Both Spanish Peru and The Men of Cajamarca have been published in Spanish translation.

He began to do research on colonial Mexico while at University of Texas, looking both at the socioeconomic patterns there and began learning Nahuatl. Fruits of these new interests were the publication of the anthology Provinces of Early Mexico: Variants of Spanish American Regional Evolution (edited with Ida Altman) and Nahuatl in the Middle Years: Language Contact Phenomena in Texts of the Colonial Period (with linguist Frances Karttunen).

He moved to University of California, Los Angeles, where he spent the bulk of his teaching career 1972–1994, retiring early and continuing to collaborate with colleagues on research projects and mentor graduate students working on historical sources in the Nahuatl language and the colonial-era Nahua people.

Among his many graduate students in colonial Spanish American social history and the philology of Mesoamerican indigenous languages, who earned doctorates under his mentorship are S.L.(Sarah) Cline, Kimberly Gauderman, Robert Haskett, Rebecca Horn, John E. Kicza, Leslie K. Lewis, Doris Namala, Leslie Offutt, Matthew Restall, Susan Schroeder, Lisa Sousa, Kevin Terraciano, John Tutino, John Super, and Stephanie Wood.

He was a major contributor to a field of ethnohistory built on the study of indigenous-language sources from colonial Mexico, which he called New Philology. He collaborated with colonial Brazilianist Stuart B. Schwartz in writing Early Spanish America (1983), which is a foundational text for graduate students studying colonial Latin America. He was the series editor for the Nahuatl Studies Series, initially based at the UCLA Latin American Center and then jointly with Stanford University Press. Lockhart was honored by the Conference on Latin American History Distinguished Service Award in 2004.

He died on 17 January 2014 at the age of 80.

== Works ==
=== Primary ===
- We People Here: Nahuatl Accounts of the Conquest of Mexico (Berkeley: University of California Press, 1993).
- Nahuatl in the Middle Years: Language Contact Phenomena in Texts of the Colonial Period (with Frances Karttunen, Berkeley: Univ. of California Press, 1976).
- Beyond the Codices: The Nahua View of Colonial Mexico (with Arthur J. O. Anderson and Frances Berdan, Berkeley: Univ. of California Press, 1976).
- The Tlaxcalan Actas: A compendium of records of the Cabildo of Tlaxcala, 1545–1627. (with Frances Berdan and Arthur J.O. Anderson). Salt Lake City: University of Utah Press, 1986).
- The Story of Guadalupe: Luis Laso de la Vega's Huey tlamahuicoltica of 1649 (with Lisa Sousa and Stafford Poole)(Stanford University Press, 1998)
- Annals of His Time: Don Domingo de San Anton Munon Chimalpahin Quauhtlehuanitzin (with Susan Schroeder and Doris Namala, 2006). (Stanford: Stanford University Press, 2006).

=== Secondary ===
- Spanish Peru, 1532-1560 (Madison: University of Wisconsin Press, 1968; second edition 1994).
- The Men of Cajamarca: A Social and Biographical Study of the First Conquerors of Peru (Austin: University of Texas Press, 1972).
- The Social History of Colonial Spanish America: evolution and potential Austin, Texas: University of Texas Institute of Latin American Studies, 1972).
- Provinces of Early Mexico: Variants of Spanish American Regional Evolution (ed., with Ida Altman). (Los Angeles: UCLA Latin American Center Publications, University of California, Los Angeles, 1976).
- Letters and People of the Spanish Indies, Sixteenth Century (with Enrique Otte). New York: Cambridge University Press, 1976).
- Early Latin America: A Short History of Colonial Spanish America and Brazil (with Stuart B. Schwartz). (New York: Cambridge University Press, 1983).
- The Art of Nahuatl Speech: The Bancroft Dialogues (ed., with Frances Karttunen, Los Angeles: UCLA Latin American Center, 1987).
- Charles Gibson and the Ethnohistory of Post-conquest Central Mexico (Bundoora, Australia: La Trobe University Institute of Latin American Studies, 1988).
- Nahuas and Spaniards: Postconquest Mexican History and Philology (Stanford: Stanford University Press; and Los Angeles: UCLA Latin American Center, 1991).
- The Nahuas after the Conquest: A Social and Cultural History of the Indians of Central Mexico, Sixteenth through Eighteenth Centuries (Stanford: Stanford Univ. Press, 1992).
- Of things of the Indies : essays old and new in early Latin American history, (Stanford: Stanford University Press, 1999).
- Grammar of the Mexican Language: With an explanation of Its Adverbs,(1645), Horacio Carochi, James Lockhart (translator)(Stanford: Stanford Univ. Press, 2001).

=== Spanish Self-Translations of his Books ===
- El mundo hispanoperuano, 1532-1560. (Spanish translation of Spanish Peru) (Mexico: Fondo de Cultura Economica, 1982).
- Los de Cajamarca: un estudio social y biografico del los primeros conquistadores del Peru (Spanish translation of The Men of Cajamarca). Lima: Editorial Milla Batres, 1986).
- America Latina en la Edad Moderna: una historia de la America Espanola y el Brazil Coloniales (Spanish translation of Early Latin America) Madrid: Akal Ediciones 1992).
- Los nahuas despúes de la conquista: historia social y cultural de los indios del Mexico central, del siglo XVI al XVIII)(Spanish translation of Nahuas After the Conquest)(Mexico: Fondo de Cultura Económico 1999.

== See also ==
- New Philology
- Historiography of Colonial Spanish America
