= Pochano =

Former Mexican citizens that are both Pochos and Chicanos

Pochanos (fem. pochanas) are former Mexican citizens that are both Pochos and Chicanos at the same time.

Chicano (fem. chicana), originally a term used by native-born Mexicans to describe persons of low class, low education and low morals. The pejorative term has been taken on in the United States of America as unifying term for Mexican people that have emigrated to the US and seeking to solidify their identity in a foreign land. Perhaps because they have not been able to assimilate they have sought to create their own unifying identity.

Likewise, Pocho (fem. pocha) is a term used by native-born Mexicans to describe Chicanos who are perceived to have forgotten or rejected their Mexican heritage to some degree. Typically, pochos speak English and lack fluency in Spanish. Among some pochos, the concept has been embraced to express pride in having both a Mexican and an American heritage, asserting their place in the diverse American culture. The word derives from the Spanish word pocho, meaning fruit that has become rotten or discolored.
