= Frances Karttunen =

American academic

Frances Esther Karttunen (born 1942), also known as Frances Ruley Karttunen, is an American academic linguist, historian and author.

== Education and career ==
She received her BA in 1964 from Harvard and her PhD in 1970 from Indiana University Bloomington, with a dissertation entitled Problems in Finnish Phonology. Most of her academic career was spent in association with the University of Texas at Austin, where she held researcher and lecturer positions for over 30 years as senior university research scientist at the Linguistics Research Center. Since 2000 she has also carried on research, lecturing, and writing as a public historian of Nantucket Island.

In her linguistics career Karttunen has specialised in the study of Mesoamerican languages such as Yucatec Maya but in particular Nahuatl, on which topic she has authored seven books and numerous academic papers. She has also written about endangered languages, linguistic diversity and language translation. Early in her career Karttunen also produced several studies of Finnish phonology and syntax, including her 1970 dissertation.

As a historian Karttunen has published research in areas such as historical Mesoamerican literature, colonial-era Aztec and Nahua history, and the social organizations, socio-political concerns and literacy rates of indigenous peoples of Mexico. Her book Between Worlds: Interpreters, Guides, and Survivors contains career biographies of fifteen indigenous individuals. ^{[15]}

Her 1976 publication Nahuatl in the Middle Years: Language Contact Phenomena in Texts of the Colonial Period, with James Lockhart, is a foundational text for Lockhart's New Philology. She followed this by an article on Nahua literacy, showing how the Mesoamerican tradition of pictorial writing then transitioned to alphabetic writing in Latin letters by local-level notaries in a self-perpetuating tradition. Her 1997 article, "Rethinking Malinche" paired with her chapter in Between Worlds about doña Marina, known as La Malinche, is a significant revisionist take on the choices that Cortés' cultural translator and consort faced.

She compiled An Analytical Dictionary of Nahuatl and several iterations of a Foundation Course in Nahuatl Grammar, culminating in the 1994 edition (with linguist R. Joe Campbell).

Karttunen has also written and lectured about the local history of Nantucket. Her books include The Other Islanders: People Who Pulled Nantucket's Oars, Nantucket's North Shore: A Neighborhood History,^{[16]} a collection of six short books on popular topics, and three commissioned works. She has published numerous articles in Historic Nantucket[^{17]} with emphasis on the island's Wampanoag, Black, and Portuguese heritages.

In 2025 she was collaborator on a documentary film, Nantucket's Historic Coloured Cemetery: Stories Told by Nantucketers ^{[18]} (with Barbara Ann White and Paul Sanderson III), and two books: How to Be Grateful: An Aztec Guide to the Art of Gratitude ^{[19]}(with Camilla Townsend) and The Adventures of Nancy Gardner Prince Written by Herself ^{[20]} (with John Walsh), a graphic adaptation of the 1850 self-published autobiography of a free Black woman.

She and her late husband, the environmental historian Alfred W. Crosby maintained long-term academic connections with universities in Finland.

== Selected publications ==
- Between Worlds: Interpreters, Guides and Survivors. New Brunswick: Rutgers University Press, 1994.
- "From Court Yard to the Seat of Government: The Career of Antonio Valeriano, Nahua Colleague of Bernardino de Sahagún". Amerindia Revue d'Etholonguistique Amérindienne, n. 20, 1995, pp. 113–120.
- "Interpreters Snatched from the Shore: The Successful and The Others". In Edward G. Gray and Norman Fiering (eds.) The Language Encounter in the Americas, 1492-1800. New Work: Berghahn Books, 2000, pp. 215–229.
