= Crónica Mexicayotl =

The Crónica Mexicayotl is a chronicle of the history of the Aztec Empire from the early Nahua migrations to the colonial period, which was written in the Nahuatl language around the 16th century. Its authorship is debated because the earliest surviving copy is written in the hand of Chimalpahin (1579–1660), while the manuscript itself states that the author is Fernando Alvarado Tezozómoc (before 1542 – c. 1610). A description of the manuscript is included in the census of central Mexican prose writings in the Handbook of Middle American Indians.

The oldest extant version of the manuscript, written by Chimalpahin, is designated MS374 and was held at the University of Cambridge until 2013. In 2014, it was repatriated by the Mexican National Institute for Archeology and History, and is now on display at the Museum of Anthropology in Mexico City. In the 18th century, a copy of the manuscript was made by Lorenzo Boturini, who published it in Tome 4 of his 1746 "Catálogo del museo histórico indiano". In the late 19th century, Boturini's manuscript was copied by father José Pichardo and Antonion León y Gama, whose manuscript is designated (MS 311); this tertiary copy is now held at the Bibliothèque Nationale de France in Paris.

In 1949, working from photocopies of the tertiary manuscript MS311, Adrian León translated the Crónica Mexicayotl into Spanish and the National Autonomous University of Mexico published it with the Nahuatl and Spanish text. This version has since been published in several editions, but being based on the tertiary version it contains errors and omissions. In 1997, American ethnohistorians Susan Schroeder and Arthur J. O. Anderson translated the earliest manuscript, MS374, into English and published it as part of their book Codex Chimalpahin. A Spanish translation by Rafael Tena was published in 2013, and a German translation of the same by Berthold Riese was published in 2004.

== Authorship ==
The problem of the authorship of the Crónica Mexicayotl arose in early studies of the document, since the introduction explicitly names Tezozómoc as the author, although the document itself is written in Chimalpahin's hand and with additions in which Chimalpahin mentions himself by name. Joseph Marius Alexis Aubin considered that Chimalpahin simply copied and annotated the text from an original manuscript by Tezozómoc. Paul Kirchoff argued that there is a stylistic break between the first part of the Crónica and the second, and argued that the first part was written by Tezozómoc and the second by Chimalpahin.

In contrast, Susan Schroeder has argued that the Crónica Mexicayotl was Chimalpahin's original work and that only the introduction was by Tezozómoc – and that it was in fact not an introduction to the Crónica, but an appendix to the work Historia o Crónica Mexicana which precedes the Crónica in the volume of the MS374. Schroeder has been contradicted by Peperstraete and Kruell, who argue that Tezozómoc's authorship of the main part of the Crónica Mexicayotl is established by the introduction (which they argue can only properly be considered an introduction and not an appendix to another work), and by the fact that most of the chronicle is about Tezozómoc's family using sources that would only have been available to him. They also add that Tezozómoc's Spanish-language Crónica Mexicana is essentially a translation of the Crónica Mexicayotl – making it all the more likely that both works are of his authorship. They consider that in writing the Crónica Mexicayotl, Tezozómoc may have also worked from the so-called Crónica X, a purported lost document of Mexican history which was also used by other authors for their works. As for Chimalpahin's role, they argue that Chimalpahin not only copied the manuscript but also added and intercalated some parts into Tezozómoc's text. Peperstraete and Kruell argue that Tezozómoc's original version of the Crónica Mexicayotl would have been elaborated before 1581, because they believe that fray Diego Durán consulted this manuscript in preparing his own History of the Indies of New Spain.

== See also ==
- History of the Aztecs
- Spanish conquest of the Aztec Empire
- Tenochtitlán
