= Earl Shorris =

American writer

Earl Shorris (Chicago, 25 June 1936 – New York City, 27 May 2012) was an American writer and social critic. He is best known for establishing the Clemente Course in the Humanities, named after baseball great and humanitarian Roberto Clemente. The Clemente Course is an "educational institution founded in 1995 to teach the humanities at the college level to people living in economic distress." He was critical of Western culture as "sliding towards plutocracy and materialism." The Clemente Course in the Humanities promotes employment, personal agency and social inclusion building up "ideas of hope, meaning, and identity into the personal" lives and narratives of participants.

Shorris published extensively on Mexico and Mexican history. Shorris made the acquaintance of Miguel León-Portilla, who published a widely-read anthology of accounts of the conquest of the Aztec Empire from Aztec viewpoints, The Broken Spears. The two subsequently published an important anthology of Mesoamerican literature, bringing to a mass market the existence of significant body of writings by indigenous Mexicans. In 2000, Shorris was awarded the National Humanities Medal.

== Bibliography ==
- Ofay (pre-1973)
- The Boots of the Virgin (pre-1973)
- The Death of the Great Spirit: An Elegy for the American Indian (1971)
- The Oppressed Middle : Politics of Middle Management : Scenes from Corporate Life Anchor Press/Doubleday (1981) ISBN 0385145640
- A Nation of Salesmen: The Tyranny of the Market and the Subversion of Culture W. W. Norton (1994) ISBN 0393334082
- Under the Fifth Sun: A Novel of Pancho Villa W. W. Norton (1980) ISBN 9780440093886
- Jews Without Mercy: A Lament Anchor Books/Doubleday (1982)
- Riches for the Poor: The Clemente Course in the Humanities W. W. Norton & Company (2000) ISBN 978-0393320664
- In the Yucatan: A Novel W. W. Norton & Company (2000) ISBN 978-0-393-34202-4
- In the Language of Kings: An Anthology of Mesoamerican Literature, Pre-Columbian to the Present (with Miguel León-Portilla). W.W. Norton & Company 2002 ISBN 978-0393324075
- The Life and Times of Mexico W. W. Norton & Company (2004) ISBN 978-0393059267
- The Politics of Heaven: America in Fearful Times W. W. Norton & Company (2007) ISBN 978-0393059632
- The Art of Freedom: Teaching the Humanities to the Poor W. W. Norton & Company (2013) ISBN 978-0-393-08127-5
- American Vespers Harper's Magazine Dec. 2011
