= Mesoamerican literature =

Literature written in or related to indigenous Mesoamerica

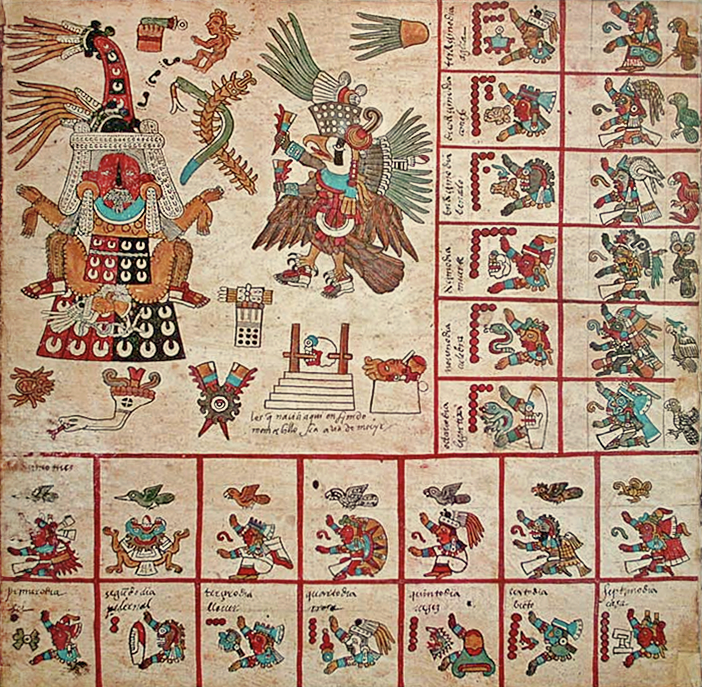
A reproduction of the original page 13 of the Codex Borbonicus, showing elements of an almanac associated with the 13th trecena of the tonalpohualli, the Aztec version of the 260-day Mesoamerican calendar.

The traditions of indigenous Mesoamerican literature extend back to the oldest-attested forms of early writing in the Mesoamerican region, which date from around the mid-1st millennium BCE. Many of the pre-Columbian cultures of Mesoamerica are known to have been literate societies, who produced a number of Mesoamerican writing systems of varying degrees of complexity and completeness. Mesoamerican writing systems arose independently from other writing systems in the world, and their development represents one of the very few such origins in the history of writing.

The literature and texts created by indigenous Mesoamericans are the earliest-known from the Americas for primarily two reasons: Firstly the fact that the native populations of Mesoamerica were the first to enter into intensive contact with Europeans, assuring that many samples of Mesoamerican literature have been documented in surviving and intelligible forms. Secondly, the long tradition of Mesoamerican writing which undoubtedly contributed to the native Mesoamericans readily embracing the Latin script of the Spaniards and creating many literary works written in it during the first centuries after the Spanish conquest of the Aztec Empire. This article summarizes current knowledge about indigenous Mesoamerican literatures in its broadest sense and describe it categorized by its literary contents and social functions.

== Precolumbian literature ==
When defining literature in its broadest possible sense, so to include all products of "literacy", its function in a literate community ought to be the focus of analysis. The following are known genres and functions of indigenous Mesoamerican literatures.

Three major subjects of Mesoamerican literatures can be identified:

- Religion, time and astronomy: Mesoamerican civilizations shared an interest in the recording and keeping track of time through observation of celestial bodies and religious rituals celebrating their different phases. Not surprisingly a large portion of the Mesoamerican literature that has been delivered down through time to us deals exactly with this kind of information. Particularly the true precolumbian literature such as the Mayan and Aztec codices deal with calendrical and astronomical information as well as describing the rituals connected to the passing of time. In terms of Aztec religious expressions, the illumination of characterestics and roles of a deity is constructed with combination of icons, since each icon shows the elements of the divine personality. The symbolic combination of a deity suggests the elements of the concept that the deity is responsible for among Aztec people.
- History, power and legacy: Another large part of the pre-Columbian literature is found carved into monumental structures such as stelae, altars and temples. This kind of literature typically documents power and heritage, memorize victories, ascension to rulership, dedications of monuments, marriages between royal lineages.
- Mythical and fictive genres: Mostly present in postconquest versions but often relying on oral or pictorial traditions the mythical and narrative literature of Mesoamerica is very rich, and we can only guess as to how much has been lost.
- Every day literature: Some texts are sort of every day literature such as descriptions of objects and their owners, graffiti inscriptions, but these only constitutes a very small part of the known literature.

=== Pictorial vs. linguistic literature ===
Geoffrey Sampson distinguishes between two kinds of writing. One kind of writing he calls 'semasiographical', this covers kinds of pictorial or ideographic writing that is not necessarily connected to phonetic language but can be read in different languages, this kind of writing is for example used in roadsigns which can be read in any language. The other kind of writing is phonetic writing called by Sampson 'glottographic' writing and which represents the sounds and words of languages and allows accurate linguistic readings of a text that is the same at every reading. In Mesoamerica the two types were not distinguished, and so writing, drawing, and making pictures were seen as closely related if not identical concepts. In both the Mayan and Aztec languages there is one word for writing and drawing (tlàcuiloa in Nahuatl and tz'iib' in Classic Maya) Pictures are sometimes read phonetically and texts meant to be read are sometimes very pictorial in nature. This makes it difficult for modern day scholars to distinguish between whether an inscription in a Mesoamerican script represents spoken language or is to be interpreted as a descriptive drawing. The only Mesoamerican people known without doubt to have developed a completely glottographic or phonetic script is the Maya, and even the Mayan script is largely pictorial and often shows fuzzy boundaries between images and text. Scholars disagree on the phonetics of other Mesoamerican scripts and iconographic styles, but many show use of the Rebus principle and a highly conventionalised set of symbols.

=== Monumental Inscriptions ===
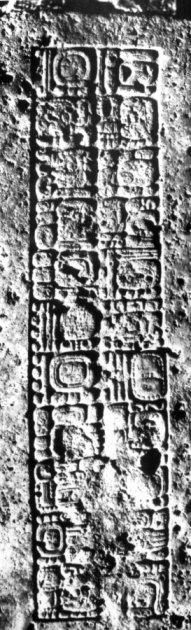
A monumental inscription in Maya hieroglyphics from the site of Naranjo, relating to the reign of king Itzamnaaj K'awil

The monumental inscriptions were often historical records of the citystates: Famous examples include:

- Hieroglyphic Stair of Copan recording the history of Copan with 7000 glyphs on its 62 steps.
- The inscriptions of Naj Tunich records the arrival of noble pilgrims to the sacred cave.
- The tomb inscriptions of Pacal the famous ruler of Palenque.
- The many stelae of Yaxchilan, Quiriguá, Copán, Tikal and Palenque and countless other Mayan archaeological sites.

The function of these kinds of historical inscriptions also served to consolidate the power of the rulers who used them also as a kind of propaganda testimonies to their power. Most commonly monumental hieroglyphical texts describe:

- Lordship: ascension and death of rulers, and the claiming of ancestry from noble lineages
- Warfare: Victories and conquest
- Alliances: Marriages between lineages.
- Dedications of monuments and buildings

The epigrapher David Stuart writes about the differences in content between the monumental hieroglyphical texts of Yaxchilan and those of Copan:

"The major themes of the known Yaxchilan monuments are war, dance, and bloodletting rituals, with several records of architectural dedicatory rites." Most of the records of wars and dances accompany scenes of the rulers, who are featured prominently in all of the texts. Copán's texts have a far lesser emphasis on historical narrative. The stelae of the great plaza, for example, are inscribed with dedicatory formulae that name the ruler as "owner" of the monument, but they seldom if ever record any ritual or historical activity. Birth dates at Copán are virtually nonexistent, as also are records of war and capture. The Copán rulers therefore lack some of the personalized history we read in the texts of newer centers in the western lowlands, such as Palenque, Yaxchilan, and Piedras Negras."

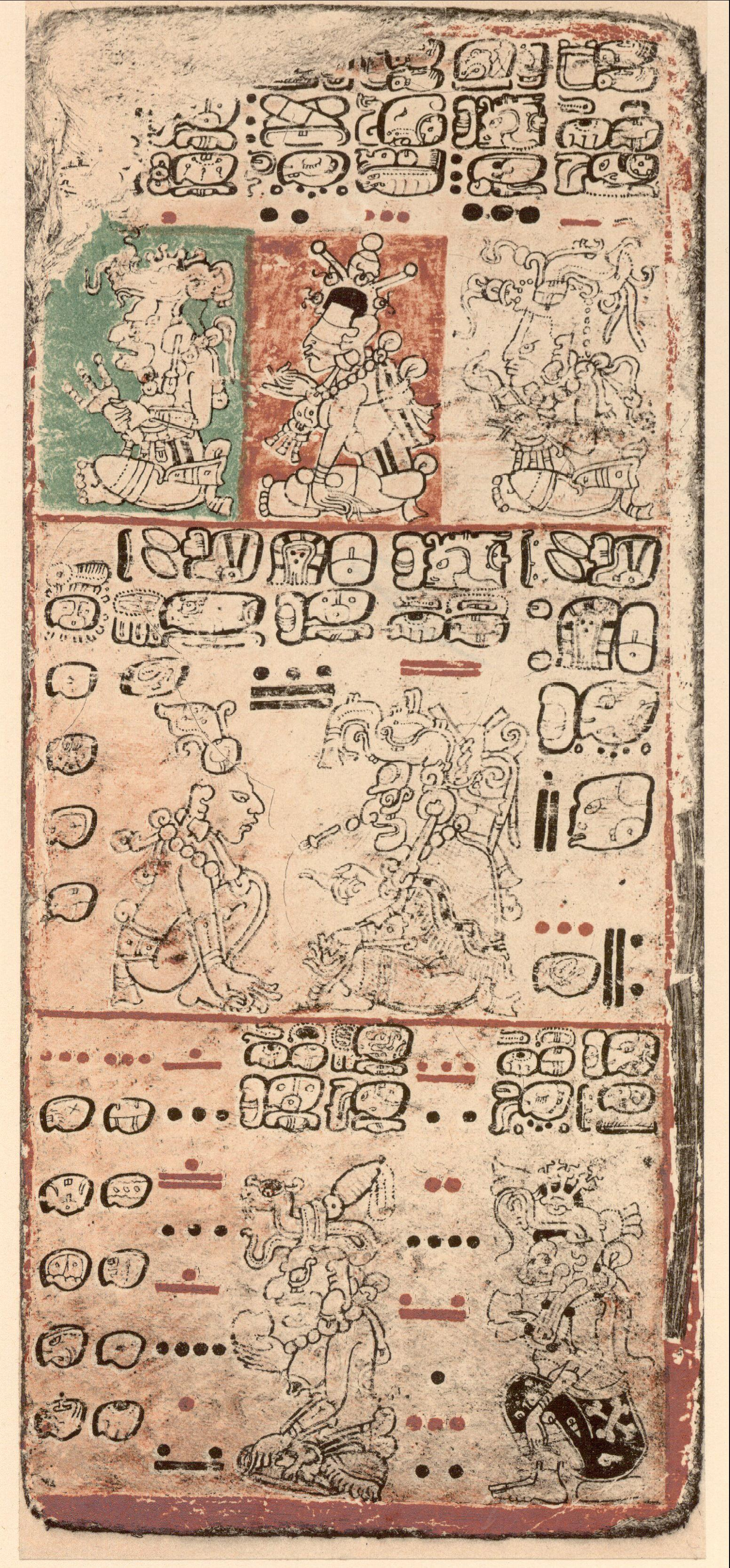
A page of the Precolumbian Mayan Dresden Codex

=== Codices ===
See also Mayan codices and Aztec codices for fuller descriptions of a number of codices.

Most codices date from the colonial era, with only a few surviving from the prehispanic era (the Conquistador invaders burned many original texts). A number of Precolumbian codices written on amate paper with gesso coating remain today.

Historical narratives

- Mixtec codices

- Codex Bodley
- Codex Colombino-Becker
- Codex Nuttall (account of the life and times of the ruler Eight Deer Jaguar Claw and the Tilantongo, Tozacoalco and Zaachila dynasties)
- Codex Selden
- Codex Vindobonensis

- Aztec codices

Astronomical, calendrical and ritual texts

- Central Mexican origins:

- Codex Borbonicus
- Codex Magliabechiano
- Codex Cospi
- Codex Vaticanus B (a.k.a. Codex Vaticanus 3773)
- Codex Fejérváry-Mayer
- Codex Laud

- Maya codices:

- Paris Codex
- Madrid Codex
- Dresden Codex
- Grolier Codex

=== Other texts ===
Some common household objects of ceramics or bone and adornments of jade have been found with inscriptions. For example, drinking vessels with the inscription saying "The Cacao drinking cup of X" or similar.

== Postconquest literatures written in Latin script ==
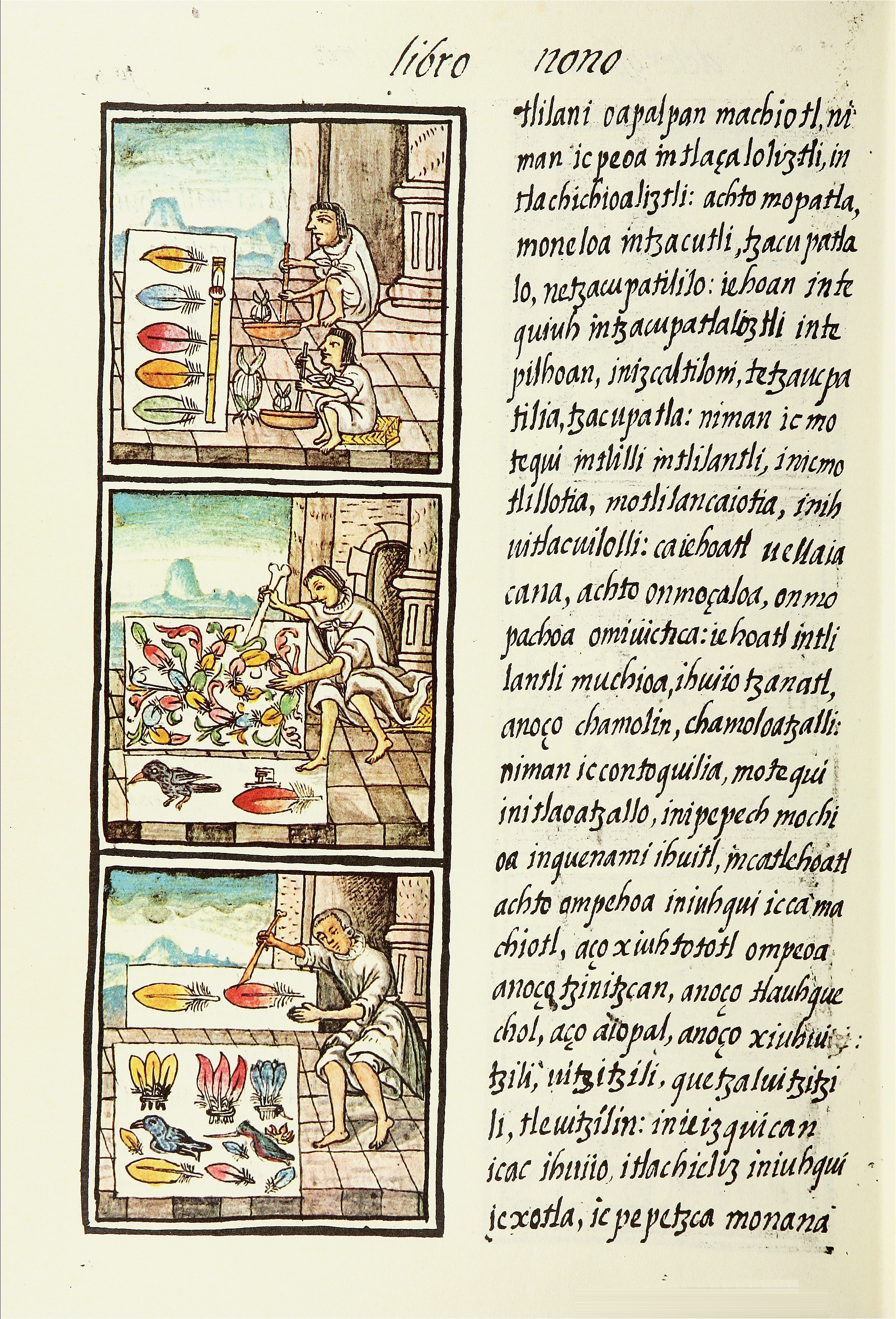
Aztec feather artisans or painters. Florentine Codex (ca. 1576) with native drawings and Nahuatl text

The largest part of the Mesoamerican literature today known has been fixed in writing after the Spanish conquest. Both Europeans and Mayans began writing down local oral tradition using the Latin alphabet to write in indigenous languages shortly after the conquest. Many of those Europeans were friars and priests who were interested in trying to convert the natives to Christianity. They translated Catholic catechisms and confessional manuals and acquired a good grasp of the indigenous languages and often even composed grammars and dictionaries of the indigenous languages. These early grammars of native languages systematized the reading and writing of indigenous languages in their own time and help us understand them today.

The most widely known early grammars and dictionaries are of the Aztec language, Nahuatl. Famous examples are the works written by Alonso de Molina and Andrés de Olmos. But also Mayan and other Mesoamerican languages have early grammars and dictionaries, some of very high quality.

The introduction of the Latin alphabet and the elaboration of conventions for writing indigenous languages allowed for the subsequent creation of a wide range of texts. And indigenous writers took advantage of the new techniques to document their own history and tradition in the new writing, while monks kept on extending literacy in the indigenous population. This tradition lasted only a few centuries however and due to royal decrees about Spanish being the only language of the Spanish empire by the mid-1700s most indigenous languages were left without a living tradition for writing. Oral literature, however, kept being transmitted to this day in many indigenous languages and began to be collected by ethnologists in the beginnings of the 20th century, however without promoting native language literacy in the communities in which they worked. It is an important and extremely difficult job in the Mesoamerica of today, and what that is only beginning to be undertaken, to return native language literacy to the indigenous peoples. But during the first post-conquest centuries a large number of texts in indigenous Mesoamerican languages were generated.

=== Codices of major importance ===
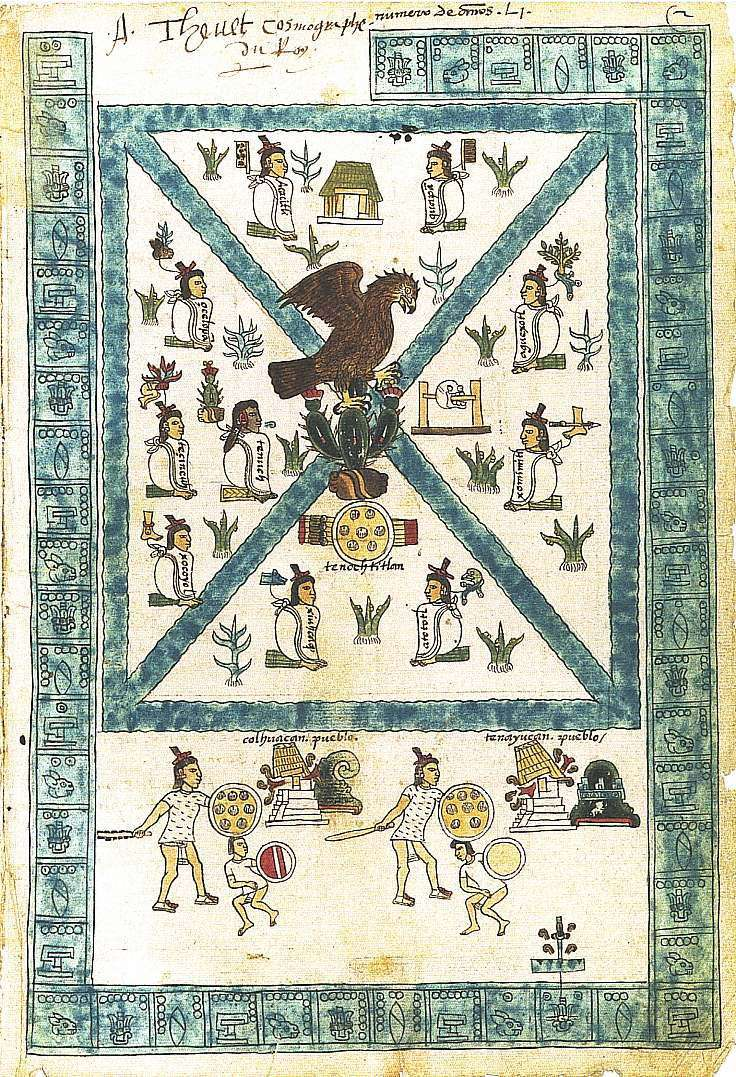
Founding of Tenochtitlan, Codex Mendoza

- Codex Mendoza
- Florentine Codex. A twelve-volume work composed under the direction of Franciscan friar Bernardino de Sahagún and sent to Europe in 1576. Separate books deal with Aztec religion, divinatory practices; lords and rulers; elite long-distance merchants pochteca; commoners; the "earthly things" including a compendium of information on flora and fauna; rocks and soil types. Volume 12 is a history of the conquest from the Tenochtitlan-Tlatelolco viewpoint. It is called the "Florentine Codex" because it was found in a library in Florence, Italy.

=== Historical accounts ===
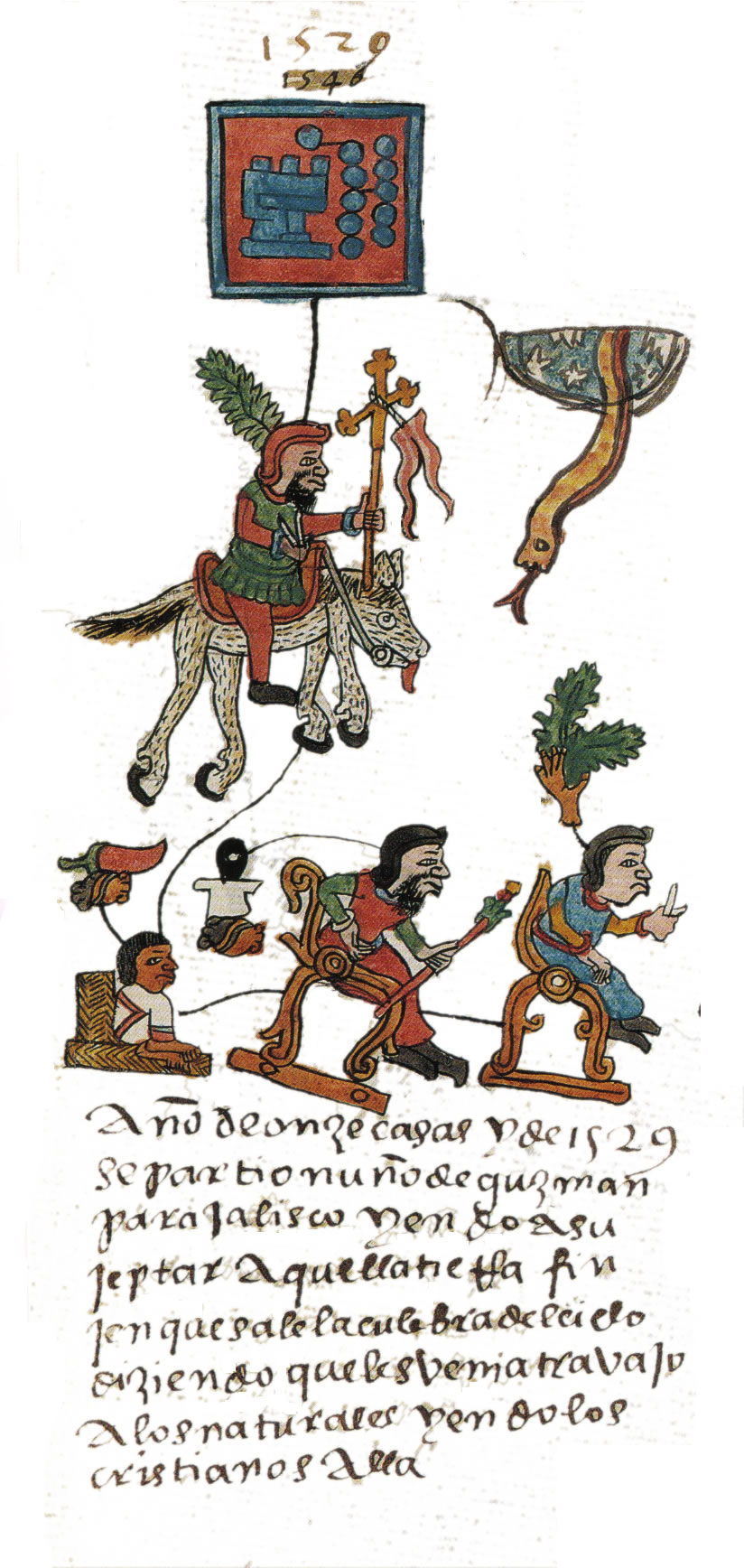
Conquistador Nuño Beltrán de Guzmán as depicted in the annal Codex Telleriano Remensis

Many of the post-conquest texts are historical accounts, either in the form of annals recounting year by year the events of a people or city-state often based on pictorial documents or oral accounts of aged community members. But also sometimes personalized literary accounts of the life of a people or state and almost always incorporating both mythical material and actual history. There was no formal distinction between the two in Mesoamerica. Sometimes as in the case of the Mayan Chilam Balam books historical accounts also incorporated prophetical material, a kind of "history in advance".

Annals

- Annals of the Cakchiquel
- Chilam Balam books from Chumayel, Maní, Tizimin, Kaua, Ixil, and Tusik
- Annals of Tlatelolco, Annals of Tlaxcala, Annals of Cuauhtitlan
- Codex Telleriano-Remensis
- Annals of the Puebla-Tlaxcala Valley
- Many local histories of a single Indigenous state in forms of Annals or picture Codices

Historias

- Cronica Mexicayotl by Fernando Alvarado Tezozomoc
- Codex Chimalpahin by Domingo Francisco de San Antón Muñon Chimalpahin Quauhtlehuanitzin
- The Lienzo de Tlaxcala a pictorial history of the conquest by Diego Muñoz Camargo
- The Lienzo de Quauhquechollan is another pictorial history of the conquest
- The Título de Totonicapán

=== Administrative documents ===
The post-conquest situation of the indigenous peoples of Mesoamerica also required them to learn to navigate in a complex new administrative system. In order to obtain any kinds of favorable positions pleas and petitions had to be made to the new authorities and land possessions and heritages had to be proven. This resulted in a large corpus of administrative literature in indigenous languages, because documents were often written in the native language first and later translated into Spanish. Historians of central Mexican peoples draw heavily on native-language documentation, most notably Charles Gibson in The Aztecs Under Spanish Rule (1964) and James Lockhart in The Nahuas After the Conquest (1992). The emphasis on native-language documentation for indigenous history has been emphasized in the New Philology.

These administrative documents include a large number of:

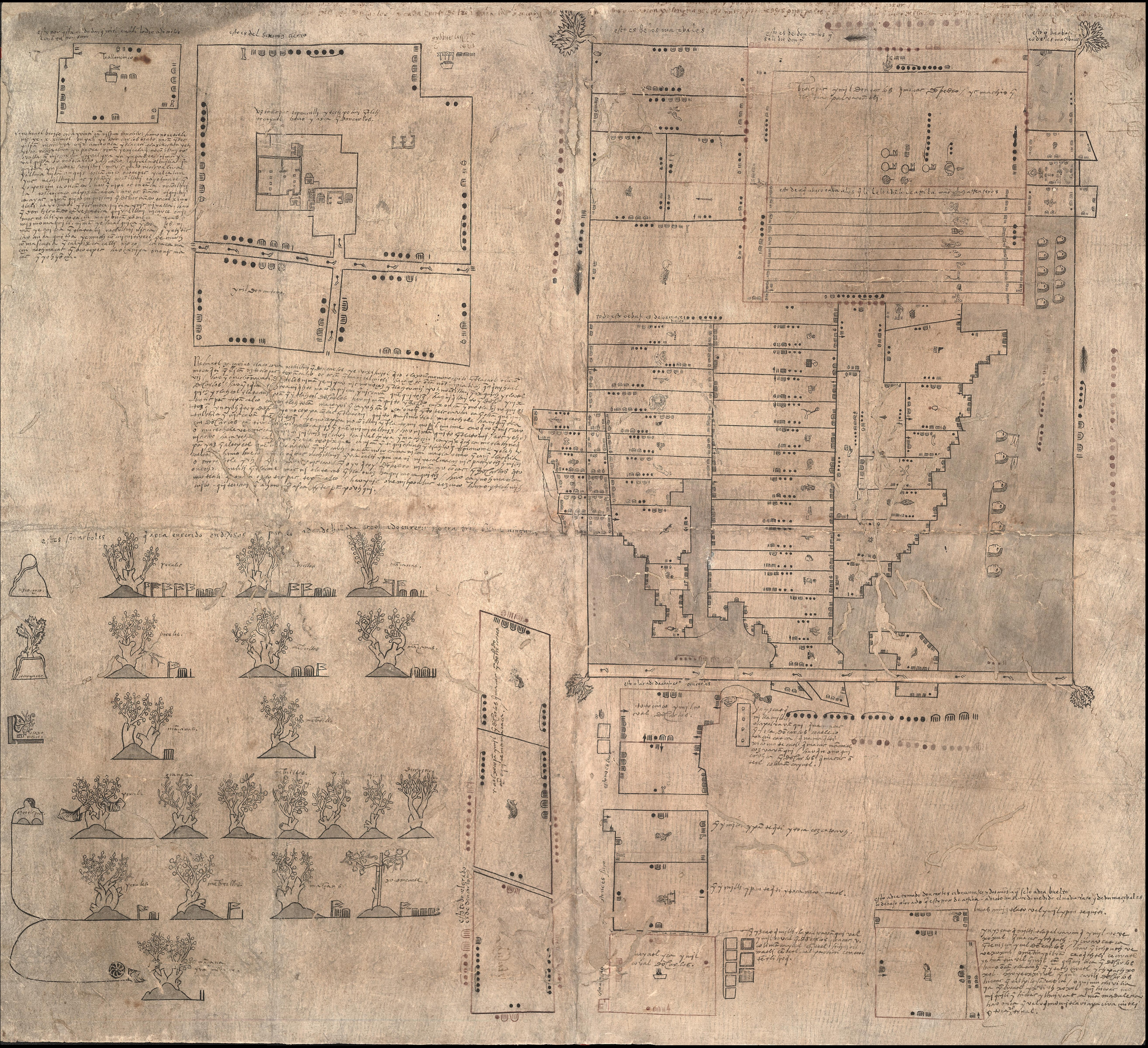
Oztoticpac Lands Map

- Testaments (legal wills of individual indigenous, sometimes kept together as books of testaments). Testaments have been utilized as a source of information on individuals, and where they appear as clusters, they give even fuller information about indigenous culture, kin relations, and economic practices. Starting in 1976, testaments have been published as an example of the potential of Mesoamerican native-language documentation, part of what is currently called the New Philology. A number collections of wills have been published, including four volumes resulting from a Mexican government-funded project La vida cotidiana indígena y su transformación en la época colonial a través de los testamentos. Some particularly rich collections of wills have been published, followed by a monograph utilizing them. In recent years, anthologies of indigenous testaments have been published from Mesoamerica and elsewhere.
  - The Testaments of Culhuacan, a set sixteenth-century wills bound together as a book, concentrated in the 1580s and the source for a social history of the town.
  - The Ixil Testaments, a book of Yucatec Maya native-language wills from the 1760s, used as a source of Yucatec Maya history.
  - Testaments of Toluca, a compilation of wills from the Calimaya / Toluca region and a basis for a history of the region
- Cabildo records (indigenous town council records), a notable example is from Tlaxcala
- Titulos (claims to territory and power by showing a noble pre-Columbian heritage).
- Censuses and tribute records (house to house censuses give important information about kinship, residence patterns, and economic information about landholding and tribute obligations). Important examples from the Cuernavaca region, Huexotzinco, and Texcoco.
- Petitions (for example petitions to lower tributary payments or complaints about abusive lords). A lengthy example is Codex Osuna, a mixed pictorial and Nahuatl alphabetic text detailing complaints of particular indigenous against colonial officials.
- Land claim documents (descriptions of landholdings often used in legal cases). An example is the Oztoticpac Lands Map of Texcoco.

=== Relaciones geográficas ===
In the late 16th century the Spanish crown sought systematic information about indigenous settlements now part of the Spanish Empire. A questionnaire was drawn up and local Spanish officials gathered information from the indigenous towns under their administration, using local elites as their principal informants. Some reports were a few pages, such as that from Culhuacan, while some major indigenous polities, such as Tlaxcala, took the opportunity to give a detailed description of their pre-Hispanic history and participation in the Spanish conquest of the Aztec Empire. Most geographical accounts include a native map of the settlement. The Relaciones geográficas were produced because colonial officials complied with royal instructions, but their content was generated by indigenous informants or authors.

=== Mythological narratives ===
The most extensively researched Mesoamerican indigenous literature is the literature containing mythological and legendary narratives. The styles of these books is often poetic and appealing to modern aesthetic senses both because of the poetic language and its "mystical", exotic contents. It is also of interest to establish intertextuality between cultures. While many do include actual historic events the mythological texts can often be distinguished by focusing on claiming a mythical source to power by tracing the lineage of a people to some ancient source of power.

- Popol Vuh (the legendary mythological history of the Quiché people)
- Codex Chimalpopoca (the main source of the Aztec creation myth of the Five Suns)
- Codex Aubin (recounting the mythical wanderings of the Mexica from Aztlan and to Tenochtitlan)
- Historia Tolteca-Chichimeca (the Aztec myth of the legendary Toltec and Chichimec peoples)

=== Poetry ===
Some famous collections of Aztec poetry have been conserved. Although written in the late 16th century they are believed to be fairly representative of the actual style of poetry used in pre-Columbian times. Many of the poems are attributed to named Aztec rulers such as Nezahualcoyotl. Because the poems were transcribed at a later date, scholars dispute whether these are the actual authors. Many of the mythical and historical texts also have poetic qualities.

Aztec poetry

- Cantares Mexicanos
- Romances de los Señores de Nueva España

Mayan poetry

- Songs of Dzitbalche

=== Theatre ===
- Rabinal Achí
- Nahuatl Theatre

=== Ethnographic accounts ===
- Florentine Codex (Bernardino de Sahagúns masterpiece of an ethnographic account contained in 12 volumes)
- Coloquios y doctrina Christiana (also known as the Bancroft dialogues, describing the first dialogues between Aztecs and monks preaching Christianity)

=== Collections of disparate treatises ===
Not all specimens of native literature can be readily classified. A prime example of this are the Yucatec Mayan Books of Chilam Balam, mentioned above for their historical content, but also containing treatises on medical lore, astrology, etc. Although clearly belonging to Maya literature, they are profoundly syncretic in nature.

== Oral literatures of the Mesoamericans ==
- Ethnography of Speaking
- Tradition and changes to them

=== Folktales ===
- Fernando Peñalosa

=== Jokes and riddles ===
- Tlacuache stories (Gonzalez Casanova)

=== Songs ===
- Henrietta Yurchenco

=== Nahuatl songs ===
- Jaraneros indigenas de Vera Cruz
- Xochipitzahuac

=== Ritual speech ===
- Mayan modern prayers
- Huehuetlahtolli
