= Ethnohistory =

Study of cultures and indigenous peoples customs

Ethnohistory is the study of cultures and indigenous peoples' customs by examining historical records as well as other sources of information on their lives and history. It is also the study of the history of various ethnic groups that may or may not still exist. The term is most commonly used in writing about the history of the Americas.

Ethnohistory uses both historical and ethnographic data as its foundation. Its historical methods and materials go beyond the standard use of documents and manuscripts. Practitioners recognize the use of such source material as maps, music, paintings, photography, folklore, oral tradition, site exploration, archaeological materials, museum collections, enduring customs, language, and placenames.

== Historical development ==
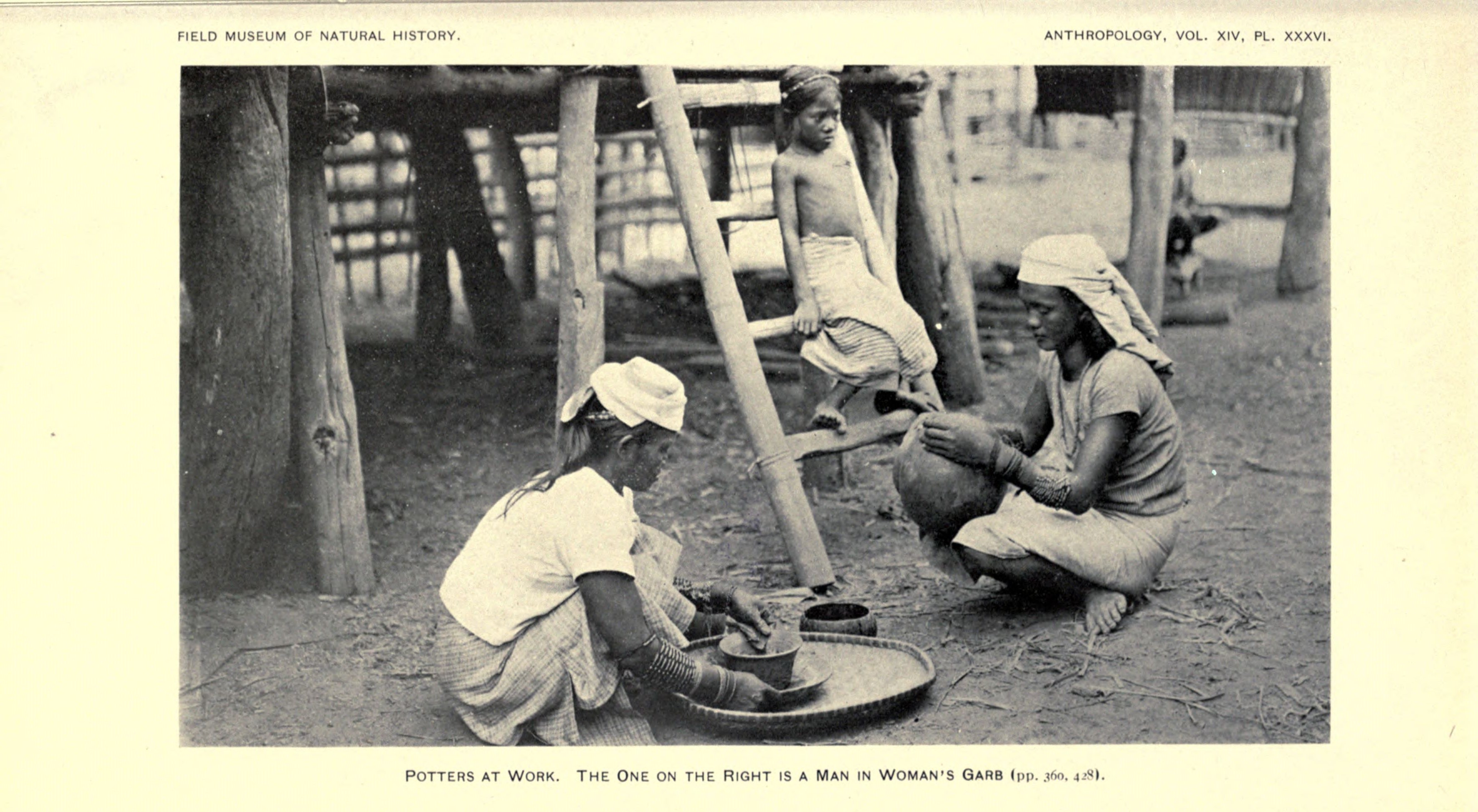
Itneg potters in northern Philippines. The person on the right is biologically male and is wearing women's clothes, a common practice in pre-colonial Philippines.

Scholars studying the history of Mexico's indigenous peoples have a long tradition, dating back to the colonial era; they used alphabetic texts and other sources to write the history of Mexico's indigenous peoples. The Handbook of Middle American Indians, edited by archeologist Robert Wauchope was involved with creating a multiple volumes on Mesoamerican ethnohistory, published as Guide to Ethnohistorical Sources, appearing in 1973. At the time that the volumes were published, "both the term 'ethnohistory' and its concepts in the sense used here have entered the literature rather recently and are not fully agreed upon." The volumes were intended to be an inventory of sources "which in later hands could utilize to produce professionally acceptable ethnohistory."

In the mid to late 20th century, a number of ethnohistorians of Mexico began to systematically publish many colonial alphabetic texts in indigenous Mexican languages, in a branch of ethnohistory currently known as the New Philology. This built on an earlier tradition of practitioners writing the history of Mexico that fully integrated the history of its indigenous peoples.

In the United States, the field arose out of the study of American Indian communities required by the Indian Claims Commission. It gained a pragmatic rather than a theoretical orientation, with practitioners testifying both for and against Indian claims. The emerging methodology used documentary historical sources and ethnographic methods. Among the scholars working on the cases was Latin Americanist Howard F. Cline, who was commissioned to work on Florida Indians and Jicarilla Apache and Erminie Wheeler-Voegelin, Director of the Great Lakes and Ohio Valley Research Project and founder of the American Society for Ethnohistory.

The field has also reached into Melanesia, where recent European contact allowed researchers to observe the early postcontact period directly and to address important theoretical questions. Michael Harkin argues that ethnohistory was part of the general rapprochement between history and anthropology in the late 20th century.

Ethnohistory grew organically thanks to external nonscholarly pressures, without an overarching figure or conscious plan; even so, it came to engage central issues in cultural and historical analysis. Ethnohistorians take pride in using their special knowledge of specific groups, their linguistic insights, and their interpretation of cultural phenomena. They claim to achieve a more in-depth analysis than the average historian is capable of doing based solely on written documents produced by and for one group. They try to understand culture on its own terms and according to its own cultural code. Ethnohistory differs from other historically-related methodologies in that it embraces emic perspectives as tools of analysis. The field and its techniques are well suited for writing histories of Native American peoples because of its holistic and inclusive framework. It is especially important because of its ability to bridge differing frameworks and access a more informed context for interpretations of the past.

The definition of the field has become more refined over the years. Early on, ethnohistory differed from history proper in that it added a new dimension, specifically "the critical use of ethnological concepts and materials in the examination and use of historical source material," as described by William N. Fenton. Later, James Axtell described ethnohistory as "the use of historical and ethnological methods to gain knowledge of the nature and causes of change in a culture defined by ethnological concepts and categories." Others have focused this basic concept on previously ignored historical actors. Ed Schieffelin asserted, for example, that ethnohistory must fundamentally take into account the people's own sense of how events are constituted, and their ways of culturally constructing the past. Finally, Simmons formulated his understanding of ethnohistory as "a form of cultural biography that draws upon as many kinds of testimony as possible over as long a time period as the sources allow." He described ethnohistory as an endeavor based on a holistic, diachronic approach that is most rewarding when it can be "joined to the memories and voices of living people."

Reflecting upon the history of ethnohistory as research field in the US, Harkin has situated it within the broader context of convergences and divergences of the fields of history and anthropology and the special circumstances of American Indian land claims and legal history in North American in the mid-20th century.

Commenting on the possibilities for ethnohistory studies of traditional societies in Europe (such as Ireland), Guy Beiner observed that "pioneering figures in the development of ethnohistory … have argued that this approach could be fruitfully applied to the study of Western societies, but such initiatives have not picked up and very few explicitly designated ethnohistories of European communities have been written to date".

== See also ==
- History
- New Philology
- Aztec codices
- Maya codices
- Cultural history
- Ethnography
- Ethnic group
- Ethnoarchaeology
- Indian Claims Commission
- History of the Romani people
