= New Philology (Latin America) =

Branch of Mexican ethnohistory and philology

New Philology generally refers to a branch of Mexican ethnohistory and philology that uses colonial-era native language texts written by Indians to construct history from the indigenous point of view. The name New Philology was coined by James Lockhart to describe work that he and his doctoral students and scholarly collaborators in history, anthropology, and linguistics had pursued since the mid-1970s. Lockhart published a great many essays elaborating on the concept and content of the New Philology and Matthew Restall published a description of it in the Latin American Research Review.

== Historical development ==
Lockhart discusses philology, particular New Philology, in an essay for a collection of essays hosted digitally at University of Oregon. For him, New Philology was built upon the foundation of the old, which focuses on close reading of texts and resulted in collections of printed documentation. An important 19th-century Mexican philologist was Joaquín García Icazbalceta. In Mexico and Latin America, 19th-century scholars mined the Spanish archives for colonial documentation for their national histories. A feature of New Philology is that the publication of indigenous texts in the original language with translations with introductions is standard. The translated texts often appeared first, followed by a separate scholarly monograph analyzing the texts. The two should be considered two parts of the same scholarly publication. Many of the scholars working in New Philology did so before it gained that designation.

A particularly valuable online publication is essays in which individual scholars discuss the process and product of translating and publishing particular native language documentation.

New Philology was developed from the 1970s and onwards, building on the work of a previous generation of scholars, most especially historian Charles Gibson, whose Aztecs under Spanish Rule (1964) and his earlier Tlaxcala in the Sixteenth Century (1952) were major scholarly achievements, placing colonial-era Aztecs (now more commonly called Nahuas) at the center of historical analysis. The leading figure in the establishment of the New Philological historiographical approach was James Lockhart who, in the early 1970s, began learning Nahuatl and studying local level indigenous sources in the Nahuatl language. His magnum opus was published in 1992, The Nahuas After the Conquest., which incorporated and extended his own work and that of others.

An early and important text in this vein was Nahuatl in the Middle Years (1976), published by Lockhart and University of Texas linguist Frances Karttunen. Also important for the early history of the New Philology was the publication of Beyond the Codices (1976), alluding to the existence of native language texts other than the formal ones termed codices. Arthur J. O. Anderson, a leading figure in Mesoamerican ethnohistory for his collaboration with Charles Dibble in publishing an English translation of the Florentine Codex by Franciscan Bernardino de Sahagún, participated in the early project of publishing local-level colonial documents.

In the mid-1970s Lockhart began mentoring history doctoral students at UCLA, who learned Nahuatl and began research on particular region documentation in Nahuatl. Sarah Cline was the first to complete a dissertation in 1981, based on these types of local-level sources, a set of 60 testaments from the central Mexican Indian polity or altepetl of Culhuacán. In 1993 Cline also published a set of early local-level Nahuatl censuses from the Cuernavaca, as The Book of Tributes, as well as an analysis of all three volumes, adding to the existing published corpus. In this first generation Robert Haskett, who examined Nahuatl texts on colonial Cuernavaca, later also publishing on primordial titles. Susan Schroeder delved into the rich texts produced by seventeenth-century Nahua historian, Chimalpahin, resulting in several publications The largest number of local-level indigenous documents, such as testaments and bills of sale, are in Nahuatl, resulting in Nahuatl having the largest set of published sets of documents and monographic scholarly analyses. Rebecca Horn's dissertation on Coyoacan and later Stanford University Press monograph showed the multiple connections between Nahuas and Spaniards. Horn also served as associate editor of the UCLA Latin American Center's Nahuatl Studies Series.

Some UCLA later doctoral students of Lockhart, particularly Matthew Restall and Kevin Terraciano, first learned Nahuatl and then other Mesoamerican indigenous languages (Mixtec and Yucatec Maya) that had a significant corpus of documents in the language. Restall's UCLA 1995 dissertation "The World of the Cah: postconquest Yucatec Maya Society" was followed by his 1995 publication of a collection of eighteenth-century wills. and culminating in his Stanford University Press monograph, The Maya World: Yucatec culture and society, 1550-1850. Terraciano's 1994 dissertation on the Mixtecs of Oaxaca entitled Ñudzahui history: Mixtec writing and culture in colonial Oaxaca was followed by his 2001 monograph The Mixtecs of Colonial Oaxaca: Ñudzahui History. Both Terraciano and Restall revised the titles of their dissertations in the published monographs to allow better recognition by readers of the publication's subject; Cline used "Aztec" in the title of her monograph on Culhuacan, rather than "Nahua", which in the 1980s had little recognition value even among specialists on Latin American cultures.

Lauren Lambert Jennings explicitly applied techniques from New Philology to the study of European Song texts quoting their "central premise [as] the idea that codex is not merely a neutral container for its texts." She continued by saying that the New Philologists and scholars of "textual cultures" "posit that a work's meaning (literary and cultural) is determined by the entire manuscript matrix — its physical form, contents, scribe(s), readers, and history."

== Works in chronological order ==
- 1976. Nahuatl in the Middle Years: Language contact Phenomena in Texts of the Colonial Period, Frances Karttunen & James Lockhart, University of California Press, Berkeley, California. ISBN 978-0520095618
- 1976. Beyond the Codices Arthur J.O. Anderson, Frances Berdan, and James Lockhart, Berkeley: University of California Press. ISBN 978-0520029743
- 1983. Azteckischer Zensus, Zur indianischen Wirtschaft und Gesellschaft im Marquesado um 1540: Aus dem "Libro de Tributos" (Col. Ant. Ms. 551) im Archivo Historico, Mexico. 2 vols. Eike Hinz, Claudine Hartau, and Marie Luise Heimann-Koenen, eds. Hanover.
- 1984. The Testaments of Culhuacan. S.L. Cline and Miguel Leon-Portilla (Eds.) UCLA Latin American Center Nahuatl Studies Series, vol. 1. ISBN 0-87903-502-1
- 1986. Colonial Culhuacan, 1580-1600: A Social History of an Aztec Town, S.L. Cline, New Mexico: University of New Mexico Press. ACLS Humanities e-book 2008. ISBN 978-1597406642
- 1986. The Tlaxcalan Actas: A Compendium of the Records of the Cabildo of Tlaxcala (1545-1627) James Lockhart, Frances Berdan, and Arthur J.O. Anderson. 1986. University of Utah Press. ISBN 978-0874802535
- 1989. The Slippery Earth: Christian Moral Dialogue in Sixteenth-Century Mexico. Louise M. Burkhart. University of Arizona Press. ISBN 978-0816510887
- 1991. Nahuas and Spaniards: Postconquest Central Mexican History and Philology, James Lockhart, Stanford University Press and UCLA Latin American Center Publications. ISBN 978-0804719544
- 1991. Chimalpahin and the Kingdoms of Chalco, Susan Schroeder, Tucson: University of Arizona Press. ISBN 978-0816511822
- 1991. Indigenous Rulers: An Ethnohistory of Indian Town Government in Colonial Cuernavaca, Robert Haskett, University of New Mexico Press. ISBN 978-0826312877
- 1992. Nahuas After the Conquest: Social and Cultural History of the Indians of Central Mexico, sixteenth through eighteenth centuries, James Lockhart, Stanford University Press. ISBN 978-0804723176
- 1993. We People Here: Nahuatl Accounts of the Conquest of Mexico, James Lockhart. Berkeley: University of California Press. ISBN 978-1592446810
- 1993. The Book of Tributes: Early Sixteenth-Century Nahuatl Censuses from Morelos. S. L. Cline, Museo de Antropología e Historia, Archivo Histórico Colección Antigua, vol. 549. UCLA Latin American Center Publications ISBN 0-87903-082-8
- 1995. Life and Death in a Maya Community: The Ixil Testaments of the 1760s. Matthew Restall. Lancaster CA: Labyrinthos ISBN 978-0911437317
- 1995. Law and the Transformation of Aztec Culture, 1500-1700. Susan Kellogg. University of Oklahoma Press. ISBN 978-0806136851
- 1997. Indian Women of Early Mexico Susan Schroeder, Stephanie Wood, and Robert Haskett (Eds.), Norman: University of Oklahoma Press. ISBN 978-0806129600
- 1997. The Maya World: Yucatec culture and society, 1550-1850. Matthew Restall. Stanford University Press. ISBN 978-0804736589
- 1997. Codex Chimalpahin: Society and Politics in Mexico-Tenochtitlan, Tlatelolco, Texcoco, Culhuacan, and other Nahua Altetpetl in Central Mexico. Domingo de San Anton Munon Chimalpahin Cuauhtlehuantzin, Arthur J.O. Anderson, Susan Schroeder, Wayne Ruwet. Norman: University of Oklahoma Press. 2 vols. ISBN 978-0806154145 ISBN 978-0806129501
- 1997. Postconquest Coyoacan: Nahua-Spanish Relations in the Valley of Mexico. Rebecca Horn. Stanford University Press. ISBN 978-0804727730
- 1998. Dead Giveaways: Indigenous Testaments of Colonial Mexico and the Andes. Susan Kellogg and Matthew Restall, eds. University of Oklahoma Press.
- 2000. From Moon Goddess to Virgins: The Colonization of Yucatecan Maya Sexual Desire. Pete Sigal. University of Texas Press.
- 2001. Saltillo, 1700-1810: Town and Region in the Mexican North. Leslie Offutt, University of Arizona Press. ISBN 978-0816521647
- 2001. The Mixtecs of Colonial Oaxaca: Ñudzahui History, sixteenth through eighteenth centuries. Kevin Terraciano. 2001, Stanford University Press. ISBN 978-0804751049
- 2002. Nahuatl as Written: Lessons in Older Written Nahuatl with Copious Examples and Texts. Stanford University Press.
- 2003. Restall, Matthew, "A History of the New Philology and the New Philology in History", Latin American Research Review - Volume 38, Number 1, 2003, pp. 113–134
- 2003. Transcending conquest: Nahua Views of Spanish Colonial Mexico, Stephanie Wood. 2003, Norman: University of Oklahoma Press. ISBN 978-0806143033
- 2004. Nahuatl Theater. Barry D. Sell, Louise M. Burkhart, Gregory Spira, and Miguel León-Portilla. University of Oklahoma Press 2004.
- 2005. Mesoamerican Voices: Native Language Writings from Colonial Mexico, Oaxaca, Yucatan, and Guatemala, Matthew Restall, Lisa Sousa, and Kevin Terraciano. 2005. Cambridge University Press. ISBN 978-0521012218
- 2005. Visions of Paradise: Primordial Titles and Mesoamerican History in Cuernavaca, Robert Haskett, 2005, Norman: University of Oklahoma Press. ISBN 978-0806135861
- 2006. Annals of His Time: Don Domingo de San Anton Muñon Chimalpahin Quahtlehuantzin, James Lockhart, Susan Schroeder, and Doris Namala. Stanford University Press. ISBN 978-0804754545
- 2007. Testaments of Toluca, Caterina Pizzigoni. 2007. Stanford University Press and UCLA Latin American Center Publications. ISBN 978-0804756075
- 2007. Sources and Methods for the Study of Postconquest Mesoamerican Ethnohistory, James Lockhart, Lisa Sousa, and Stephanie Wood (eds.), Provisional Version hosted by the Wired Humanities Project at the University of Oregon (2007).
- 2008. The Art of Being In-Between: Native Intermediaries, Indian Identity, and Local Rule in Colonial Oaxaca. Yanna Yannakakis. Duke University Press.
- 2009. Here in This Year: Seventeenth-Century Nahuatl Annals of the Tlaxcala-Puebla Valley. Camilla Townsend, ed. Stanford University Press. ISBN 978-0804763790
- 2010. Chimalpahin's Conquest: A Nahua Historian's Rewriting of Francisco Lopez de Gomara's La Conquista de Mexico. Domingo de San Anton Muñon Chimalpahin Cuauhtlehuantzin, Susan Schroeder, David Tavaez, Christian Roa de la Carrera. 2010. Stanford University Press. ISBN 978-0804769488
- 2010. Indigenous Miracles: Nahua Authority in Colonial Mexico. Edward W. Osowski. University of Arizona Press.
- 2012. The Life Within: Local Indigenous Society in Mexico's Toluca Valley, 1650-1800 Caterina Pizzigoni. Stanford University Press. ISBN 978-0804781374
- 2012. A Language of Empire, a Quotidian Tongue: The Uses of Nahuatl in New Spain. Robert C. Schwaller. Duke University Press 2012.
- 2013. Nahua and Maya Catholicisms: Texts and Religion in Colonial Central Mexico and Yucatan. Mark Z. Christensen. Stanford University Press.
- 2014. Translated Christianities: Nahuatl and Maya Religious Texts. Mark Z. Christensen. Penn State University Press.
- 2014. The Learned Ones: Nahua Intellectuals in Postconquest Mexico. Kelly S. McDonough. University of Arizona Press.
- 2014. Indigenous Intellectuals: Knowledge, Power, and Colonial Culture in Mexico and the Andes. Gabriela Ramos and Yanna Yannakakis, eds. Duke University Press.
- 2016. The Aztecs at Independence: Nahua Culture Makers in Central Mexico, 1799-1832. Miriam Melton-Villanueva. University of Arizona Press ISBN 9780816533534
- 2017. The Woman who turned into a Jaguar and other Narratives of Native Women in Archives in Colonial Mexico. Lisa Sousa. Stanford University Press. ISBN 97-81503601116
- 2023 Los Testamentos de Culhuacán: Vida y Muerte entre los Nahuas del México Central, siglo XVI. Transcripciones del náhuatl, traducciones al español e inglés. Editado por Miguel León-Portilla y Sarah Cline, con la colaboración de Juan Carlos Torres López. México: Universidad Iberoamericana ISBN 978-607-417-967-5 digital, open access publication

== See also ==
- Aztec codices
- Historiography of Colonial Spanish America
- History of New Spain
- Spanish conquest of the Aztec Empire
- Spanish conquest of Yucatán
