= Ixtlilxochitl =

Ixtlilxochitl can refer to a number of Mesoamerican nobles, including:

- Ixtlilxochitl I, tlatoani (ruler) of the central Mexican city-state of Texcoco from 1409 to 1418.
- Ixtlilxochitl II, placed on the throne of Texcoco by Hernan Cortés in 1520, and a great-grandson of Ixtlilxochitl I.
- Fernando de Alva Cortés Ixtlilxochitl (1568? 1578? - c. 1650), an indigenous Mexican nobleman, historian and author, descendant of Ixtlilxochitl I and Ixtlilxochitl II.

Ixtlilxochitl can also refer to

- Codex Ixtlilxochitl, historical Mesoamerican document authored by Fernando de Alva Cortés Ixtlilxochitl
- Ixtlilxochitl, an alleged ancient Native American historian (See article on Jaredites).
