= Codex Magliabechiano =

Mid-16th century pictorial Aztec codex

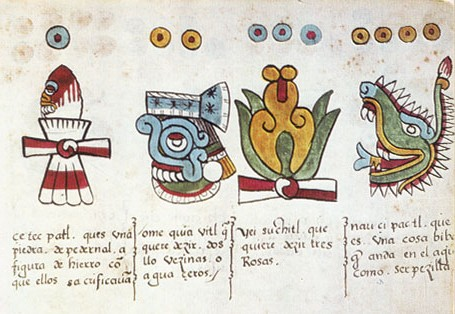
The reverse of folio 11 of the Codex Magliabechiano, showing the day signs Flint (knife), Rain, Flower, and Crocodile.

The Codex Magliabechiano is a pictorial Aztec codex created during the mid-16th century, in the early Spanish colonial period. It is representative of a set of codices known collectively as the Magliabechiano Group (others in the group include the Codex Tudela and the Codex Ixtlilxochitl). The Codex Magliabechiano is based on an earlier unknown codex, which is assumed to have been the prototype for the Magliabechiano Group. It is named after Antonio Magliabechi, a 17th-century Italian manuscript collector, and is held in the Biblioteca Nazionale Centrale, Florence, Italy.

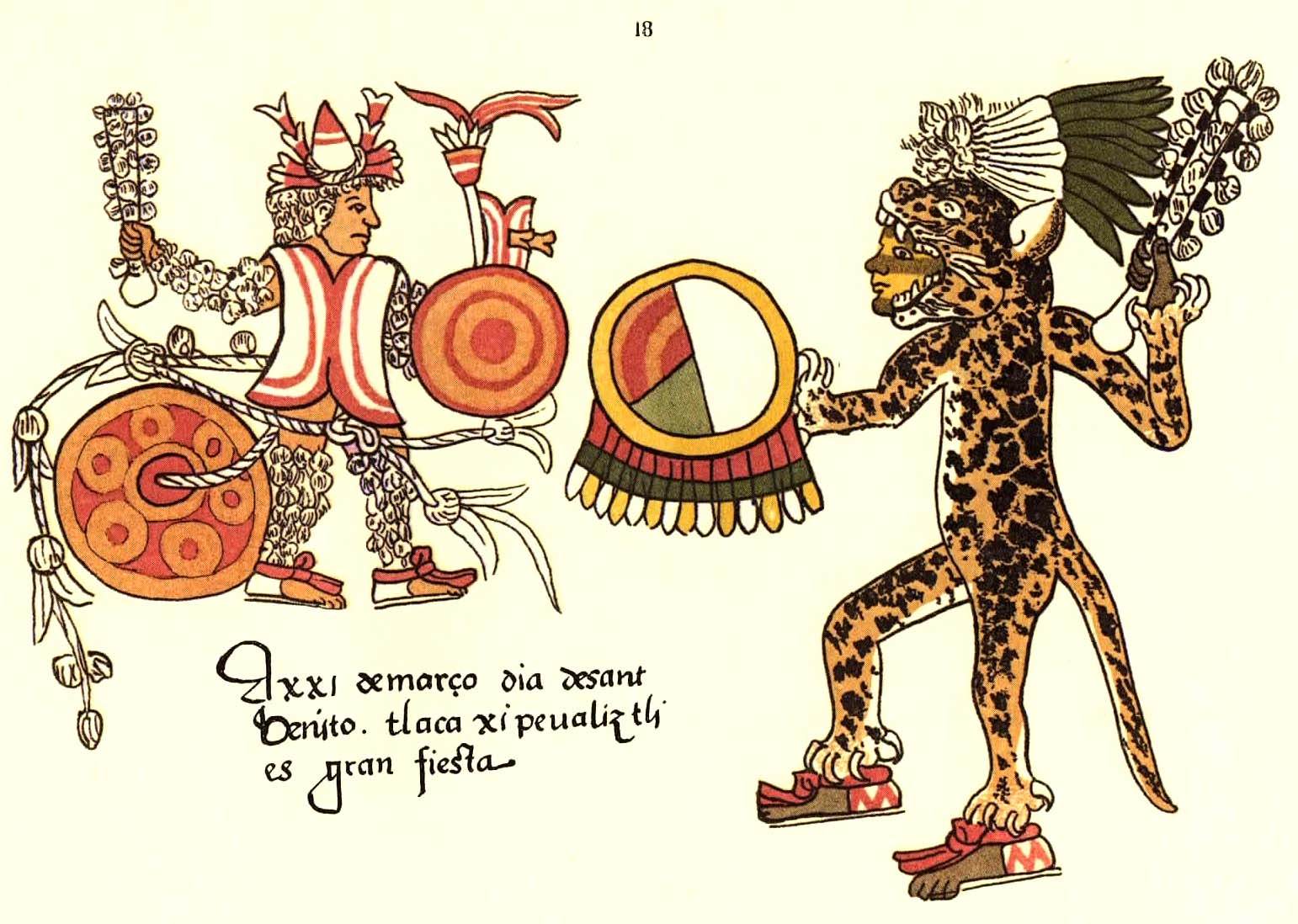
Folio 30

It was created on European paper, with drawings and Spanish language text on both sides of each page. The Codex Magliabechiano is primarily a religious document. Various deities, indigenous religious rites, costumes, and cosmological beliefs are depicted. Its 92 pages are almost a glossary of cosmological and religious elements. The 52-year cycle is depicted, as well as the 20 day-names of the tonalpohualli, and the 18 monthly feasts.

== Images ==
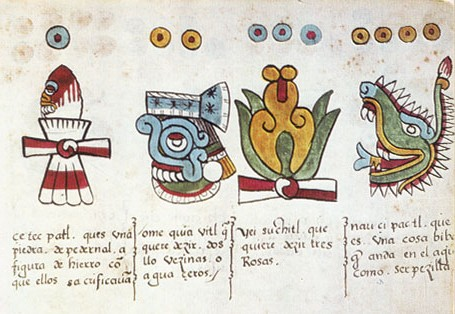
The first four day-symbols of the tonalpohualli: Flint, Rain, Flower, Crocodile. (Page 11, reverse) (the Rain day-symbol resembles symbol of Tlaloc)

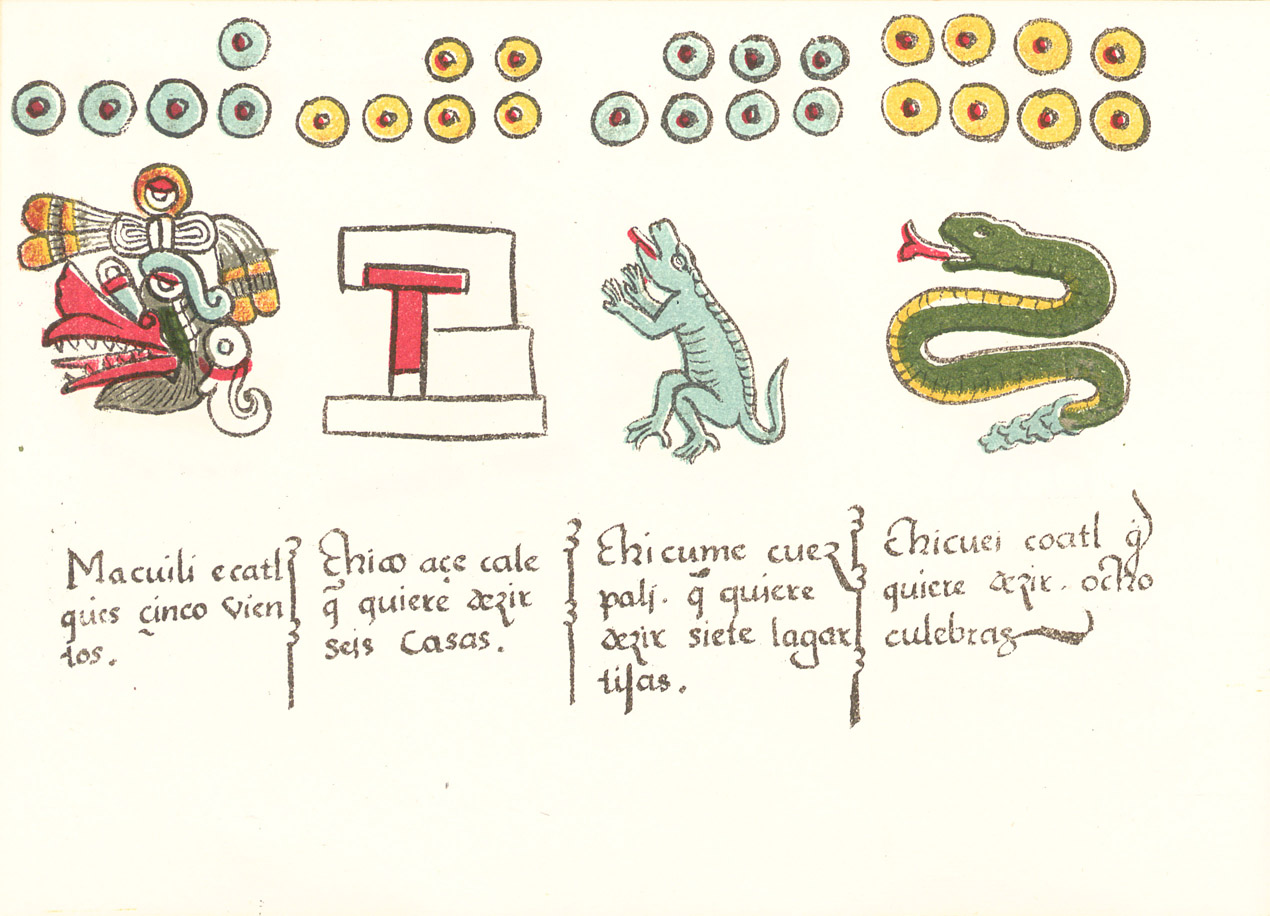
Depicts the Aztec calendrical signs for the days 5 Wind, 6 House, 7 Lizard and 8 Snake. (Folio 11v)

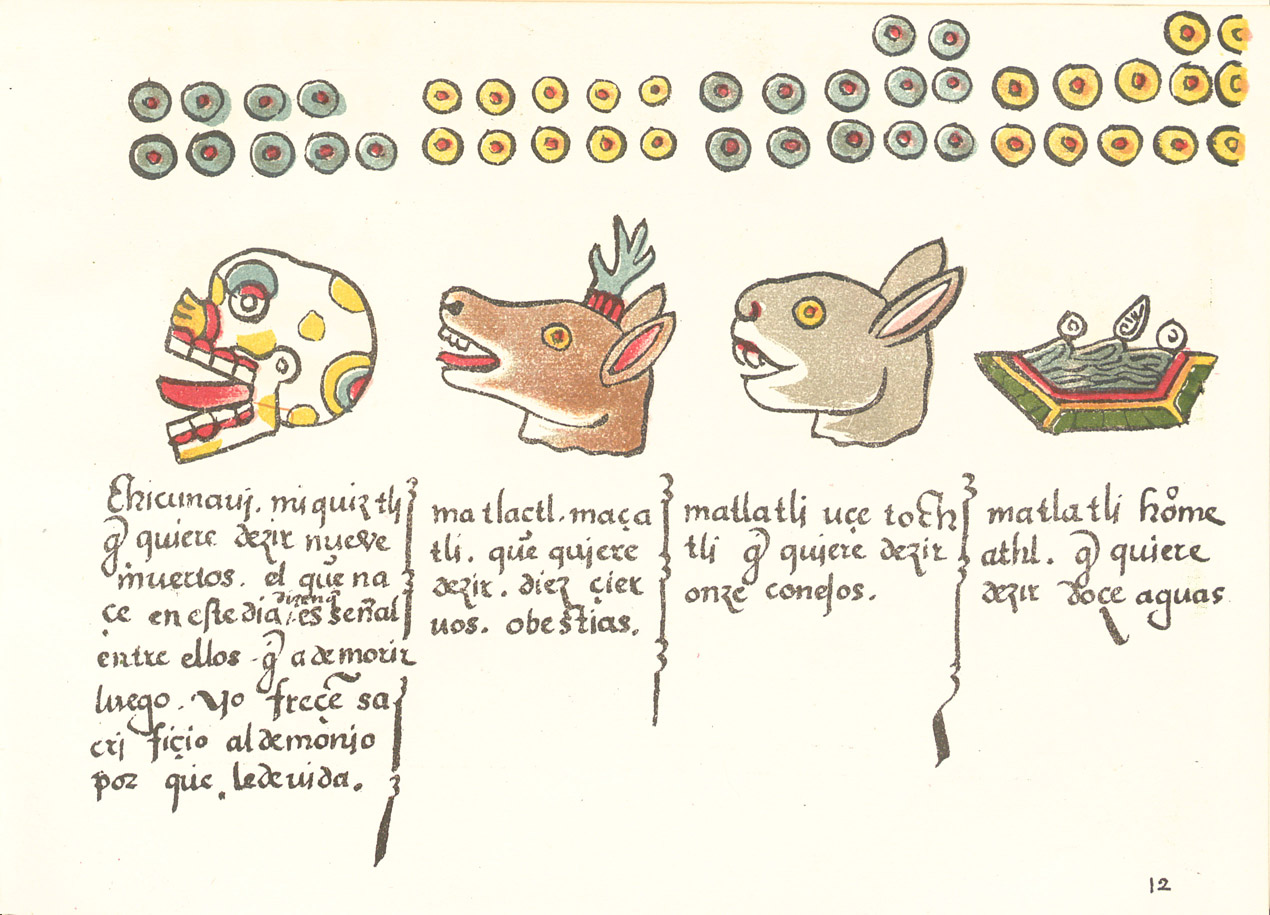
Calendrical signs for the days 9 Death, 10 Deer, 11 Rabbit and 12 Water. (Folio 12r)

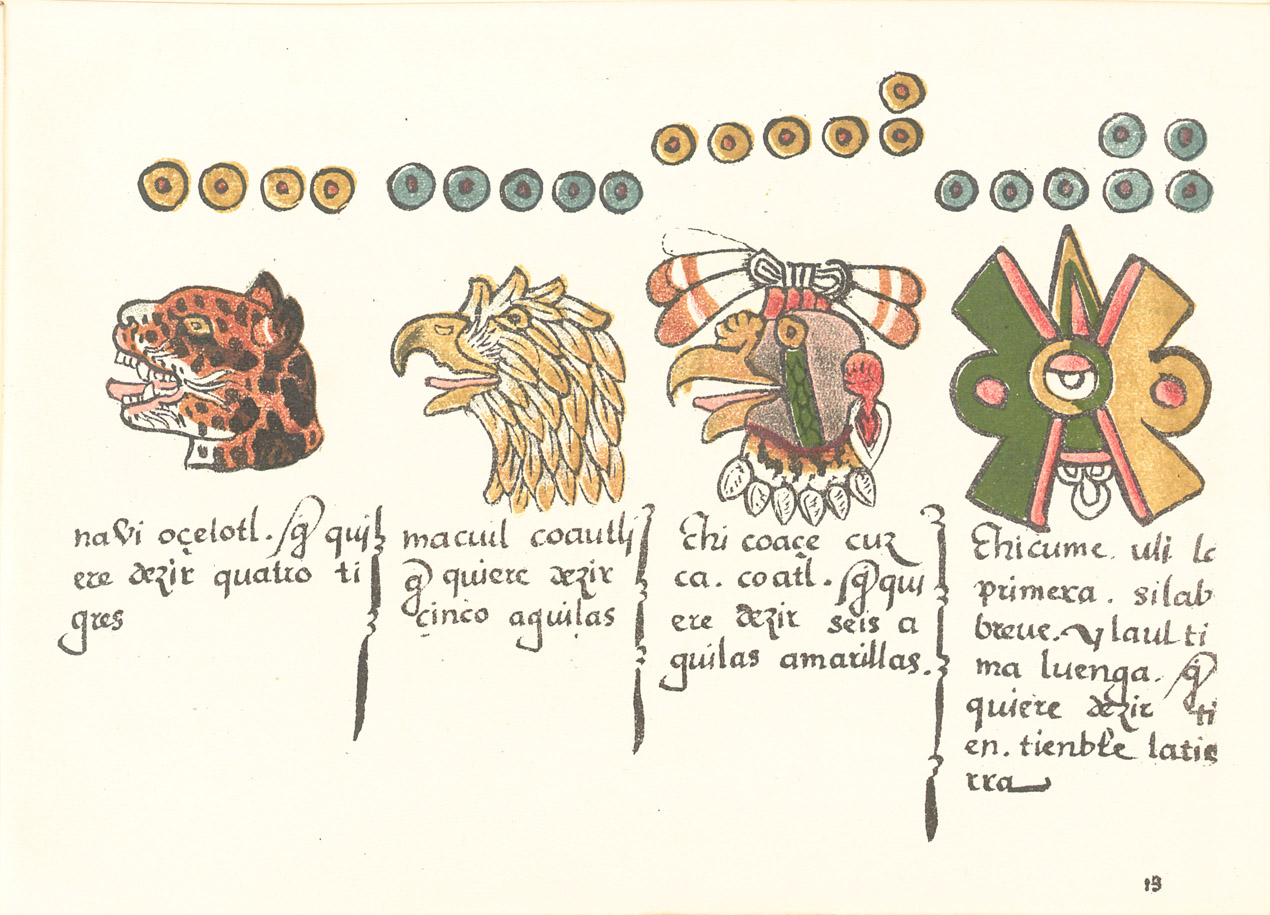
Calendrical signs for the days 4 Jaguar, 5 Eagle, 6 Vulture and 7 Quake. (Folio 13r)

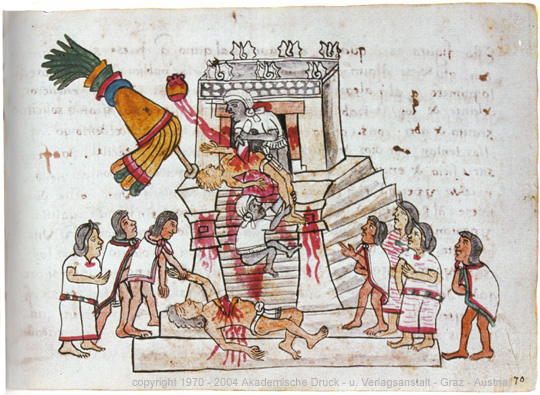

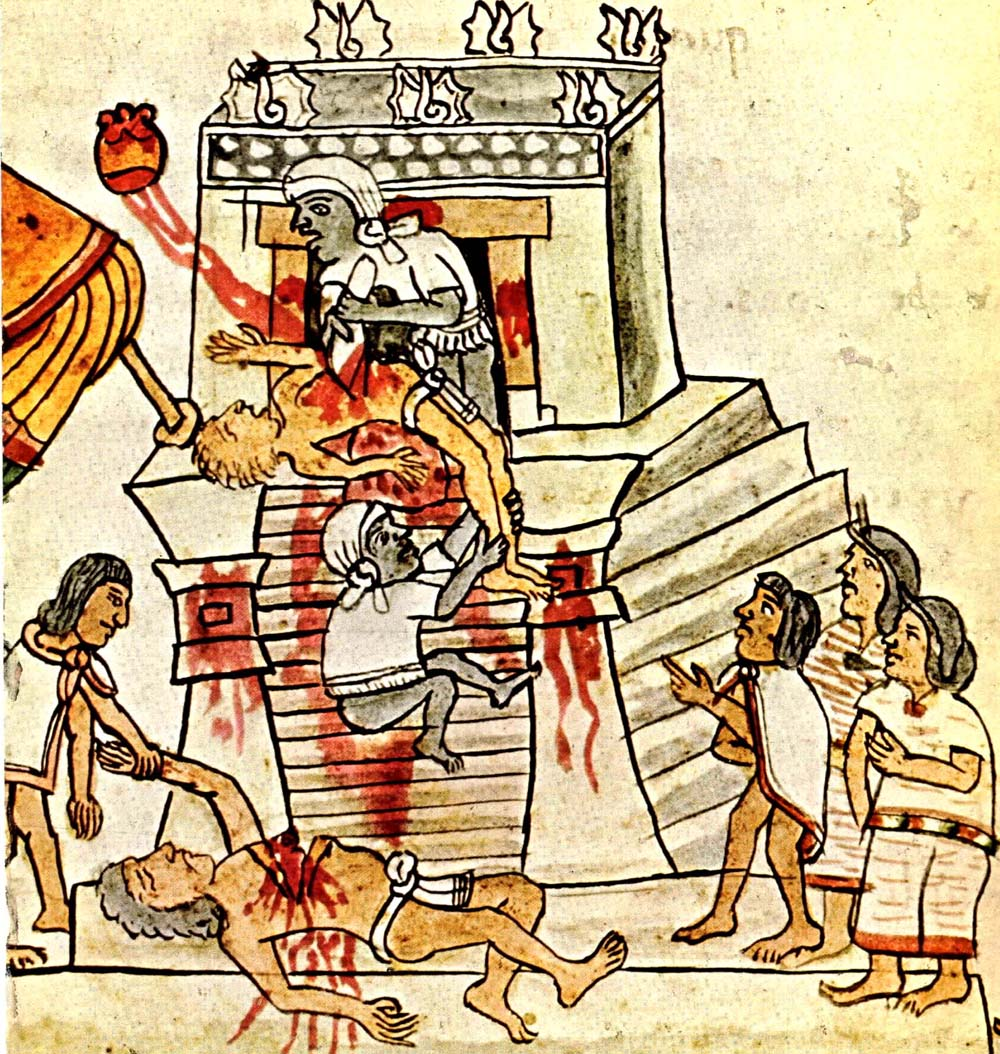

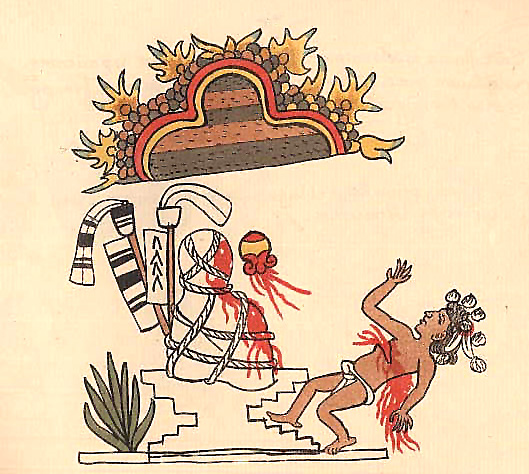

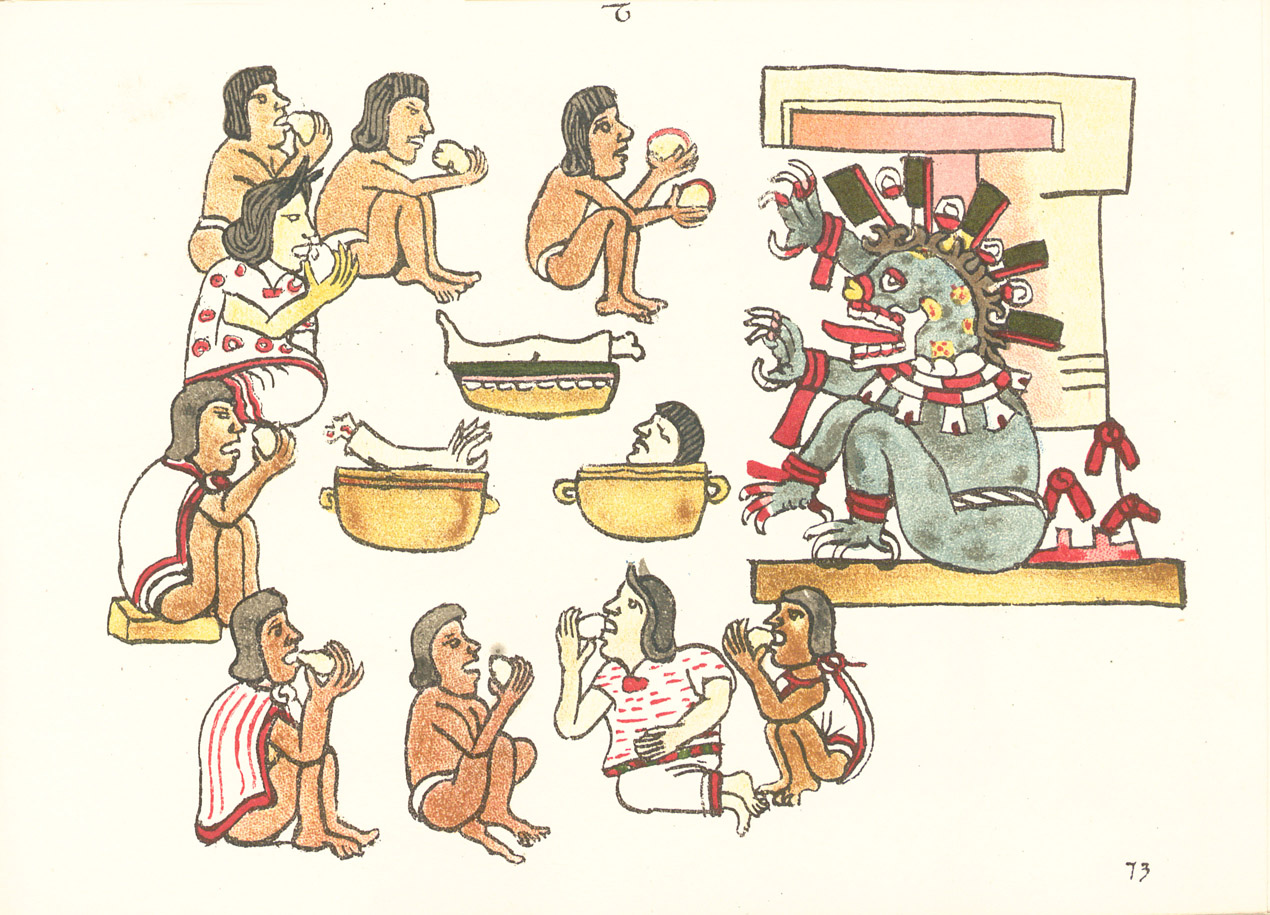
A depiction of cannibalism in Aztec culture. (Folio 73r)

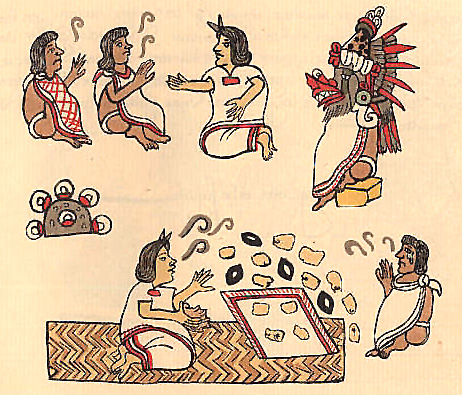

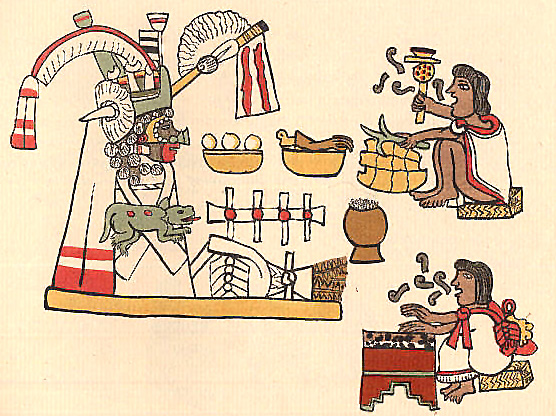
Possibly depicting Tititl festival

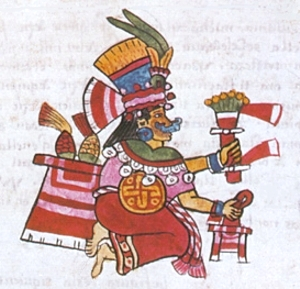
Chicomecoatl

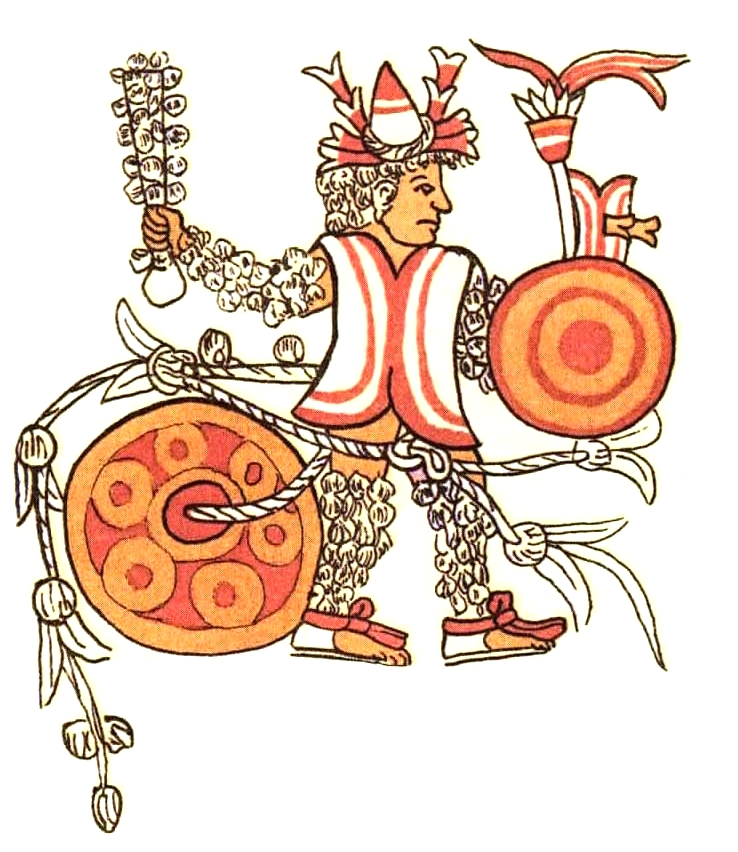

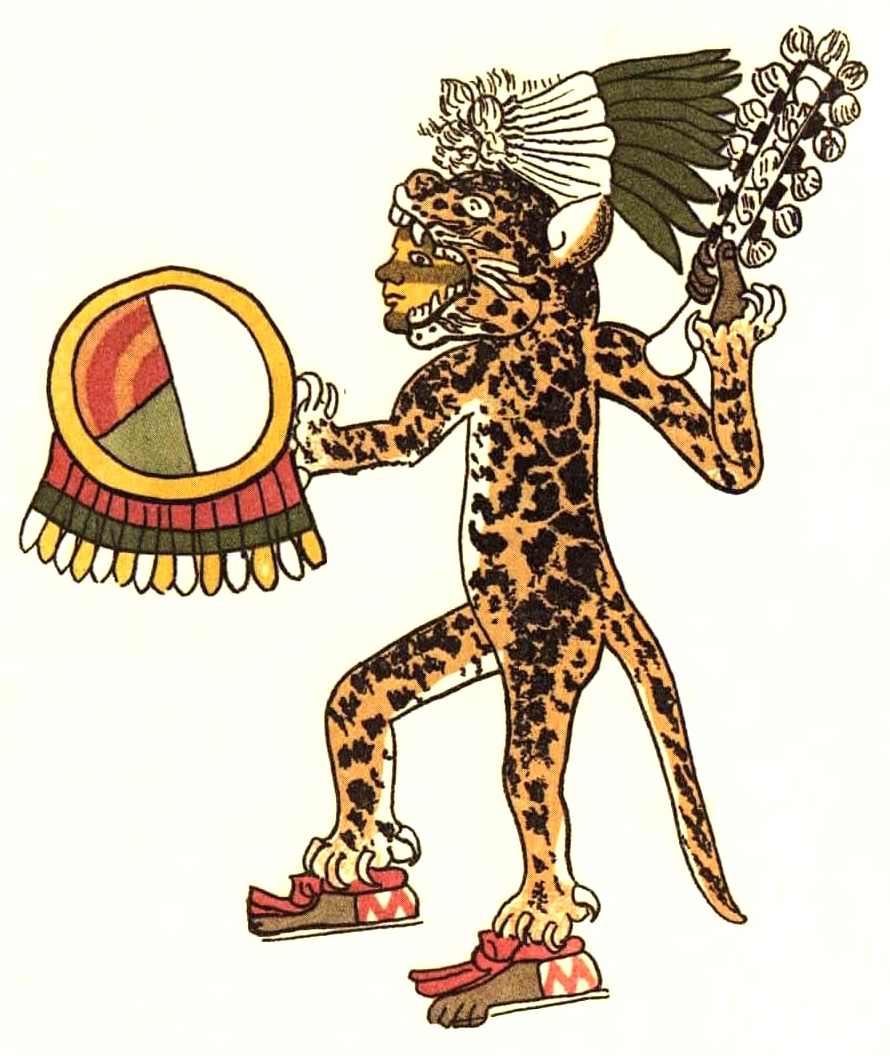
Victim of the ritual sacrificial combat named Sacrificio Gladiatorio in spanish and Tlahuahuanaliztli o tlauauaniliztli in nahuatl, as portrayed in the folio 30r

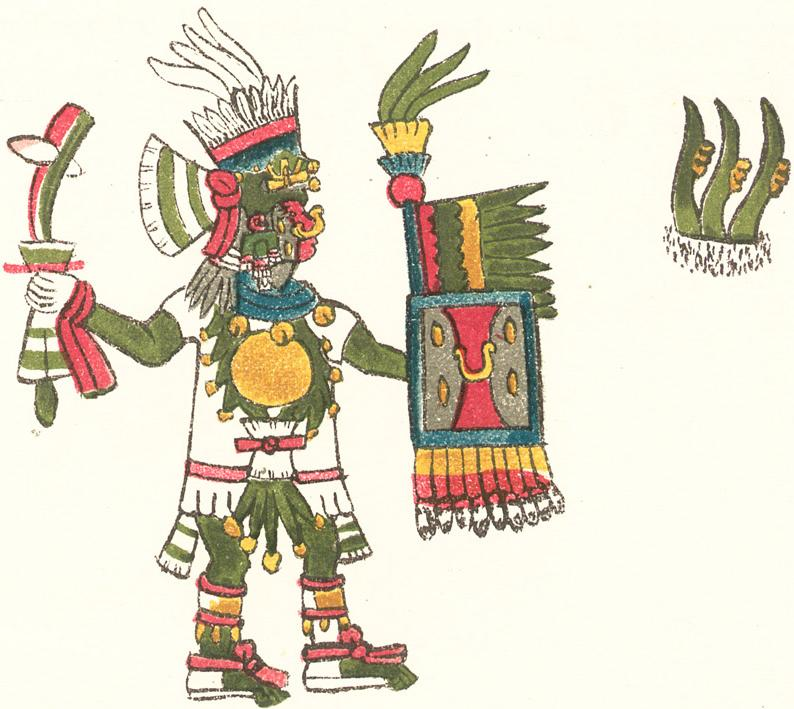
Toltecatl

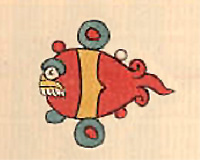
Could be Manta ornament

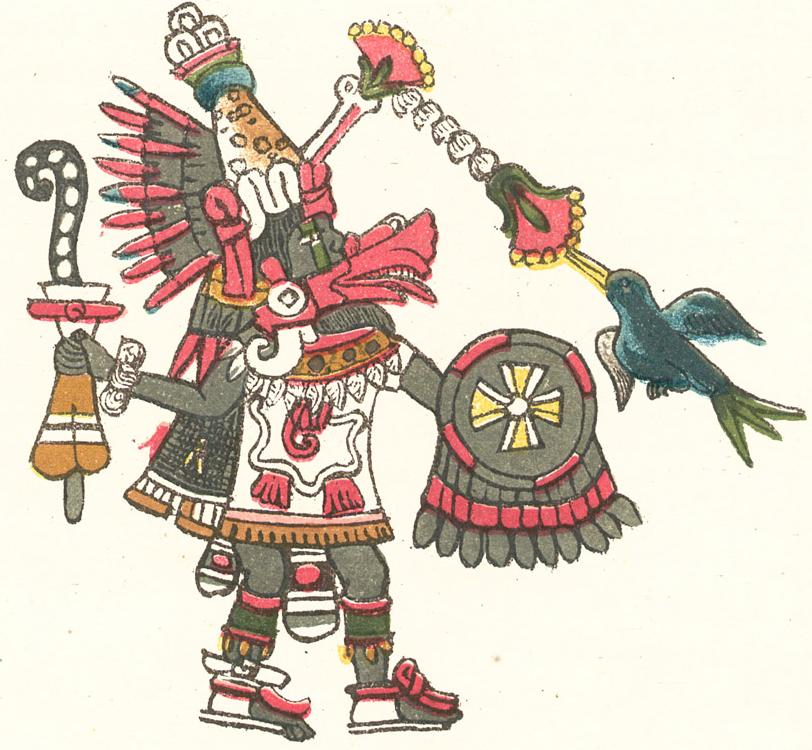
Could be Quetzalcoatl

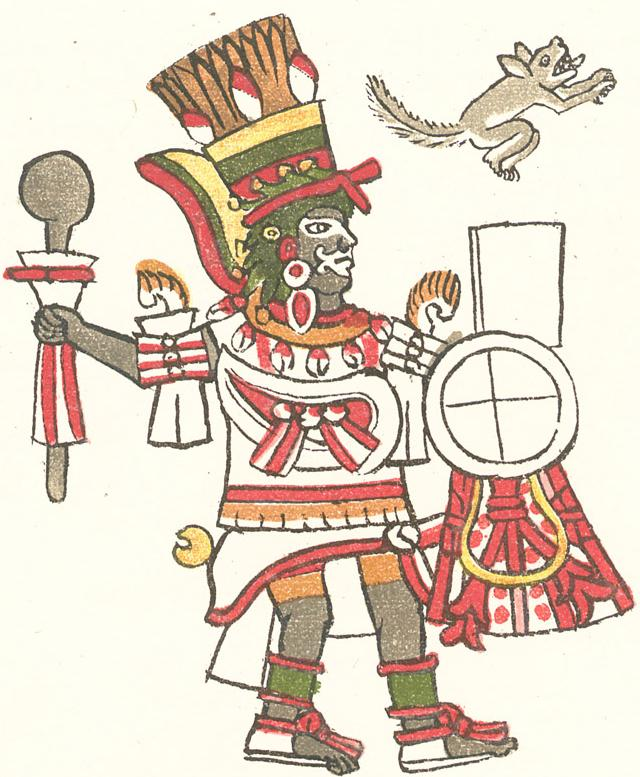
Could be Techalotl

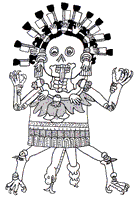
Could be Tzitzimitl

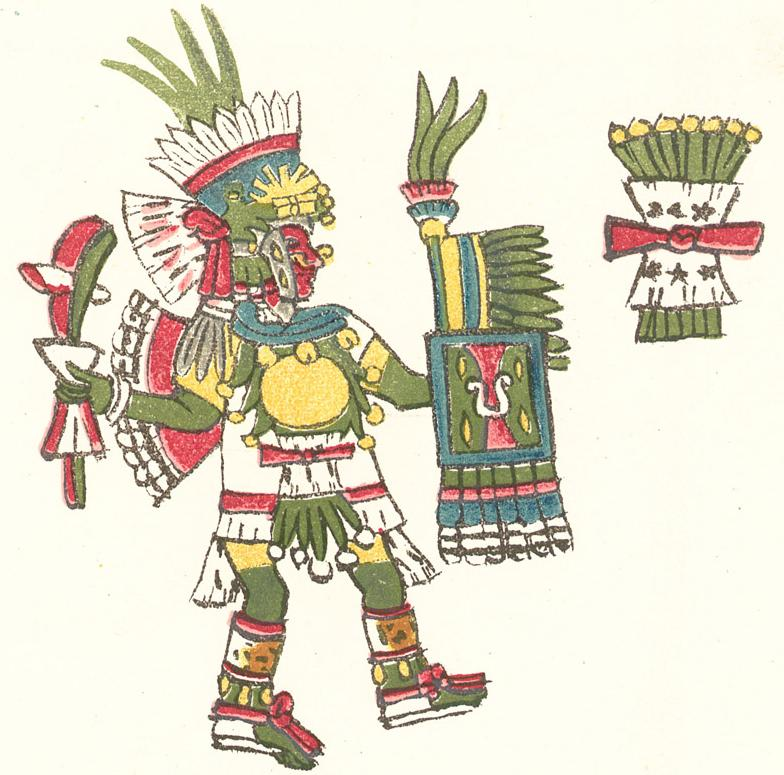
Yauhtecatl

SVG renderings

Calli (house)

Tochtli (rabbit)

Xochitl (flower)

Mazatl (deer)

Icons

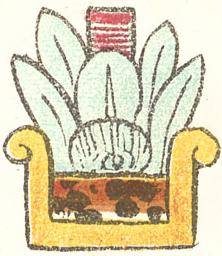
Acatl (reed)

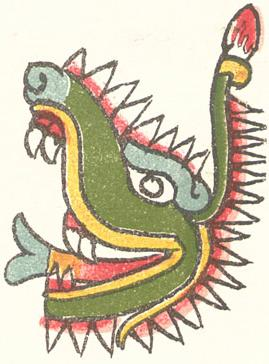
Cipactli (crocodile)

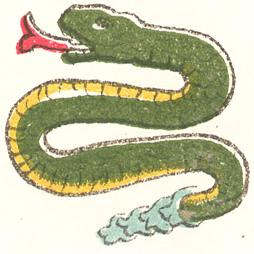
Coatl (serpent)

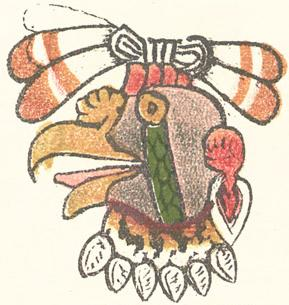
Cozcacuauhtli (vulture)

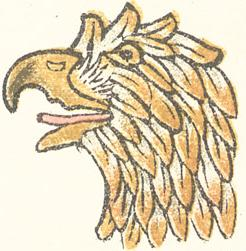
Cuauhtli (eagle)

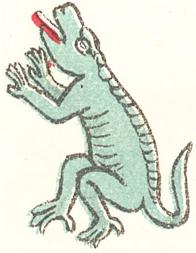
Cuetzpalin (lizard)

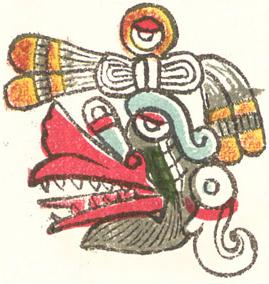
Ehecatl

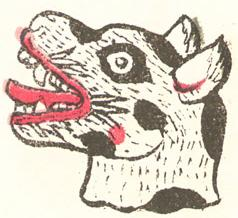
Itzcuintli (dog)

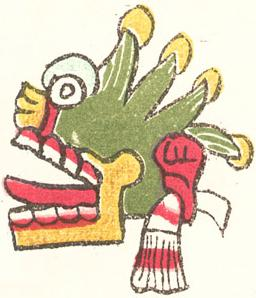
Malinalli (grass)

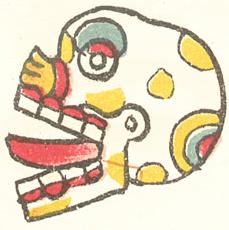
Miquiztli (death)

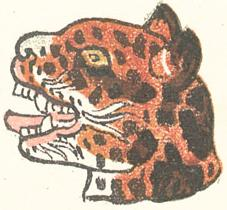
Ocelotl (ocelot)

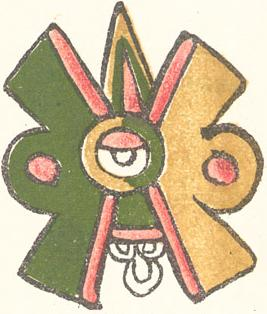
Olin (movement)

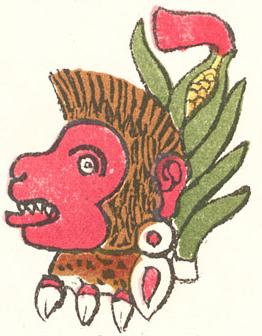
Ozomatli (monkey)

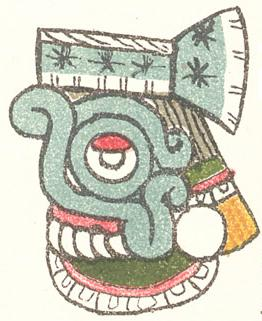
Quiahuitl (rain)

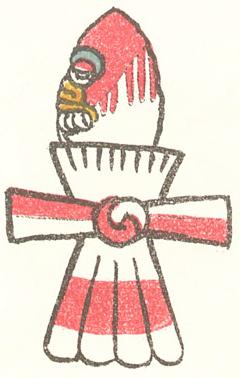
Tecpatl (flint)
