= Codex Tudela =

Aztec codex

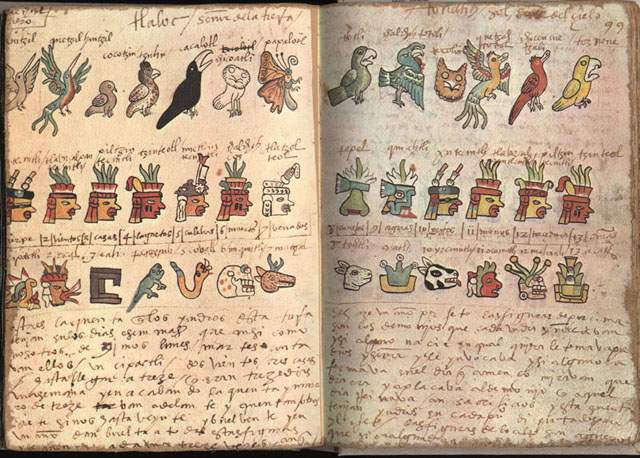
Folios 98 verso and 99 recto, showing aspects of the Aztec calendar: the birds of the day, the lords of the night, and the day signs.

The Codex Tudela is a 16th-century pictorial Aztec codex. It is based on the same prototype as the Codex Magliabechiano, the Codex Ixtlilxochitl, and other documents of the Magliabechiano Group.

Little is known about the codex's history. The Spanish government bought the manuscript when it was rediscovered in 1940, and it is now held by the Museo de América in Madrid. Sr José Tudela de la Orden, after whom it was named, worked at the Museo de America and made the codex known to scholars. In Spanish it is sometimes called the Códice del Museo de América.

The Tudela Codex is a document written in the mid-16th century, in Mexico during the early colonial period, on European laid paper. It has three parts, Libro Indígena, Libro Pintado Europeo and Libro Escrito Europeo. The first part occupies pages 11 to 125 and was painted by the Indian scribes in a Pre-Hispanic style near 1540, containing iconography and hieroglyphic writing information regarding Mexican or Aztec religion; types of calendar, rituals regarding disease and death, gods of the drunk, etc. The codex is a religious document that details deities, religious rites, religious ceremonies, cosmological beliefs, calendars and rituals regarding topics such as disease and death.

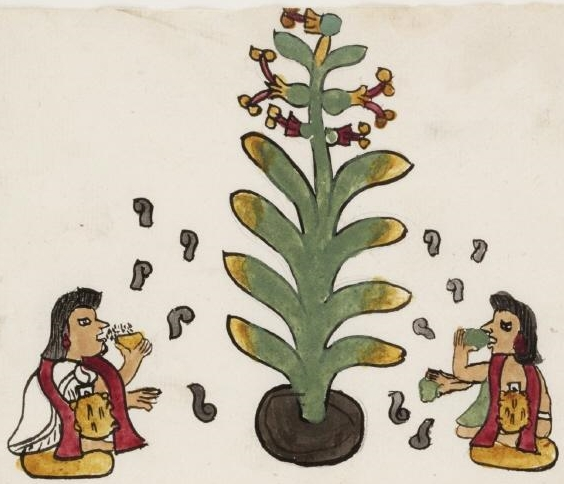
Codex Tudela f. 69r detail
