= Huematzin =

Totlec figure mentioned in codices

Huematzin (Nahuatl pronunciation: [weˈmatsin]) is mentioned in some Mesoamerican codices as being a sage and a member of Toltec nobility and scholar who lived during the end of the 8th century. It is unknown whether he was an actual historical person or a legendary figure. According to the Aztec chronicles he was the wisest man in Tollan, city of the Toltecs which may or may not be identical with the archeological site of Tula, and he owned many sacred books (called teoamoxtli in Nahuatl).

Huematzin's name is in a manuscript by the indigenous scholar and nobleman Fernando de Alva Cortés Ixtlilxochitl, Relaciones Históricas, written some time around 1600.
