= Fernando de Alva Cortés Ixtlilxóchitl =

Scholar, Nobleman, Painter and Scribe of Aztec Noble Descent

Fernando de Alva Cortés Ixtlilxóchitl, more generally known as Fernando de Alva Ixtlilxochitl, born between 1568 and 1580, died in 1648, was a nobleman of partial Aztec noble descent in the Spanish Viceroyalty of New Spain, modern Mexico; he is known primarily for his works chronicling indigenous Aztec history.

== Life ==
Born between 1568 and 1580, Alva Cortés Ixtlilxóchitl was a direct descendant of Ixtlilxochitl I and Ixtlilxochitl II, who had been tlatoque (rulers) of Texcoco. He was descended from an indigenous grandparent and three Spanish grandparents. He was also the great-great-grandson of Cuitláhuac (Cuitláhuac was the eleventh son of the ruler Axayacatl and a younger brother of Moctezuma II, the previous ruler of Tenochtitlan.), the penultimate Aztec ruler of Tenochtitlan and victor of La Noche Triste. On the death of his eldest brother in 1602, he was declared by a royal decree heir to the titles and possessions of his family. The property, however, does not appear to have been large, as he complained in 1608 of the deplorable state of misery to which the posterity of the kings of Texcoco were reduced.

He was a distinguished student at the Imperial Colegio de Santa Cruz de Tlatelolco, where he was educated in both Nahuatl and Spanish. He lived in San Juan Teotihuacán from 1600 to 1604.

In 1608, he was employed as interpreter by the viceroy, which appointment he owed to his learning and skill in explaining the hieroglyphic pictures of the ancient Mexicans. He had also a profound knowledge of the traditions of his ancestors which were preserved in the national songs, and "was intimate with several old Native Americans famous for their knowledge of Mexican history." He turned his own labors and those of his friends to account in composing works on the history of his country. They remained unknown until their importance was revealed by Clavijero, and afterward by Humboldt. The former says that they were written in Spanish by command of the viceroy, and were deposited in the library of the Jesuits in Mexico. There were copies also in other libraries.

In 1612 he was governor of Texcoco, and in 1613 governor of Tlalmanalco. In spite of his illustrious birth, good education and obvious ability, he lived most of his life in dire poverty. Most of his works were written to relieve his wants. He died in Mexico City in 1648.

== Works ==
He was commissioned by the Spanish viceroy of New Spain to write histories of the indigenous peoples of Mexico. His Relación histórica de la nación tulteca (usually called Relación) was written between 1600 and 1608. This was an account of many events in New Spain, and many events of the Toltec people. The Relación and most of his other accounts and compilations contain writing fragments and songs, with much repetition and little organization. He gives a detailed account of the important part played by his great-grandfather Don Fernando Ixtlilxóchitl II in the conquest of the Aztec Empire and the pacification of the Indigenous of New Spain, praising him in every possible way and condemning the ingratitude of the conquerors.

Later (1610 to 1640, according to Chavero), Alva wrote the Spanish work Historia chichimeca, which refers to the same events, but with more organization. Historia chichimeca is not the original title, which is unknown, but was supplied by Carlos de Sigüenza y Góngora when the manuscript was in his possession. Lorenzo Boturini Bernaducci, who owned the same manuscript later, called it Historia general de la Nueva España. There are indications it was part of a larger work, the rest of which has been lost, or perhaps was unfinished. It ends with the siege of Mexico. The work gives the Texcoca version of pre-Columbian history and the conquest, in contrast to the work of Fernando Alvarado Tezozómoc, which gives the Mexica version. The Historia chichimeca is considered Alva's best work.

His works contain very important data for the history of Mexico, but except for Historia chichimeca, they are written without order or method, the chronology is very faulty, and there is much repetition.

Alfredo Chavero published his works, annotated, with the title of Obras históricas (Historical Works) in 1891–1892. José Ignacio Dávila Garibi reproduced that edition with a new prologue in 1952.

The Codex Ixtlilxochitl is attributed to him.

He wrote two memorials, Sucinta and Sumaria, addressed to Viceroy Luis de Velasco, hijo, and Fray García Guerra. These were attempts to recover some of the property and privileges of his royal ancestors. Partly owing to these appeals, and partly to the favor of Fray García Guerra, who afterwards became archbishop of Mexico and viceroy of New Spain, some land concessions were granted him, and in the last years of his life he was appointed interpreter in the Indian judiciary court. He was still working there when he died in 1648, poor and forgotten. His son, Juan de Alva Cortés, inherited his documents and before his death were given to Don Carlos de Sigüenza y Góngora.

== See also ==
- Huematzin, 8th century sage (either real or legendary) mentioned in 'Relaciones Históricas'
