= Toltecatl =

Nahuatl word

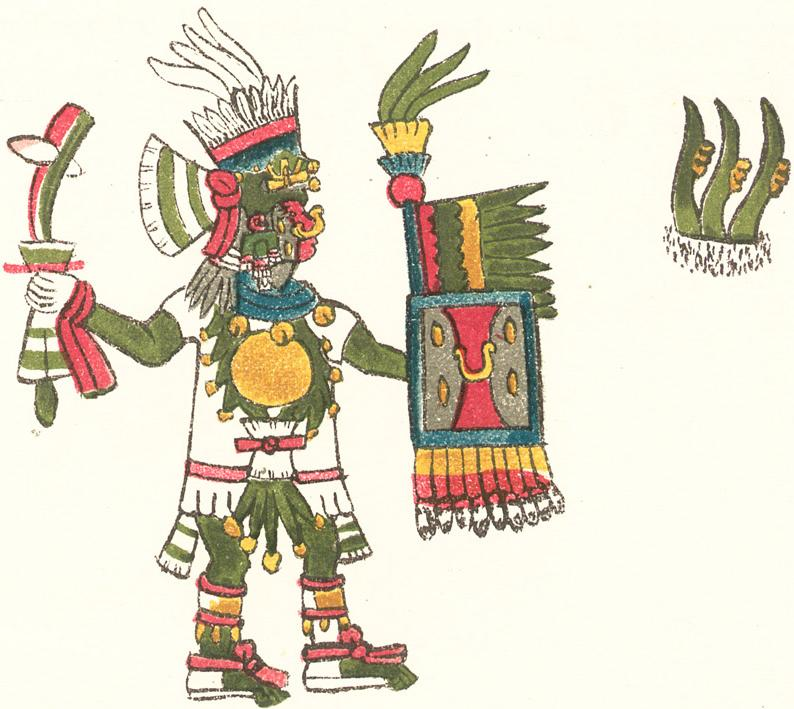
Toltecatl

Tōltēcatl (Nahuatl for "the Toltec" or "the artisan"; pronounced [toːɬˈteːkatɬ]) means skilled craftsman or artisan.
