= Codex Ixtlilxochitl =

Pictorial Aztec record, early 1580s

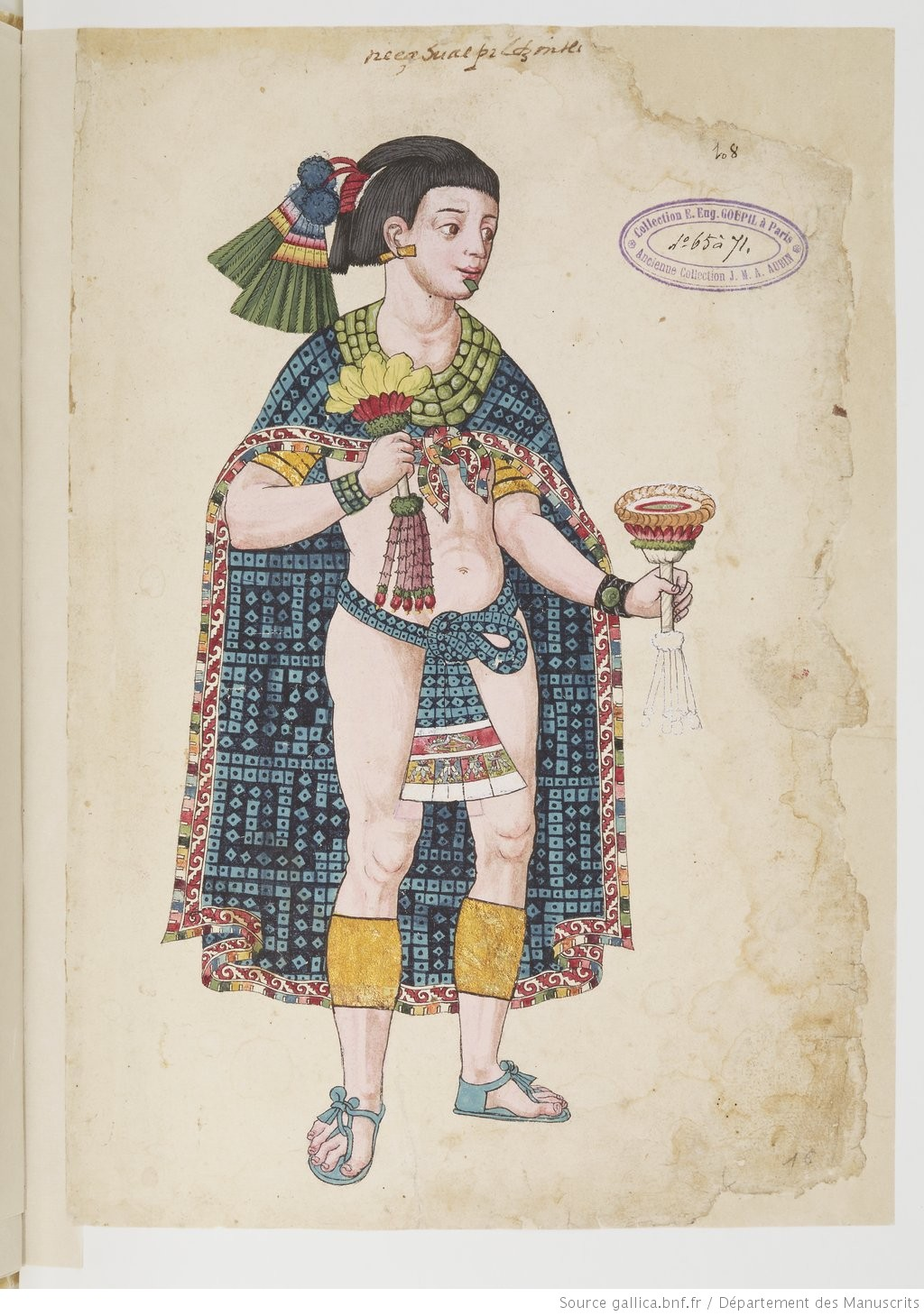
Nezahualpilli, king of Texcoco, portrayed in the fourth illustration of the second section

Codex Ixtlilxochitl (Nahuatl for "black-faced flower") is a pictorial Aztec Codex created between 1580 and 1584, during the Spanish colonial era in Mexico. It depicts past ceremonies and holidays observed at the Great Teocalli of the Aztec altepetl or city-state of Texcoco, near modern-day Mexico City, and has visual representations of rulers and deities with association to Texcoco. The existence of this codex is a demonstration of the cultural assimilations and interactions between native Aztecs, Spanish colonists, and mestizos that occurred during the 17th century in Mexico as the colonies developed and their residents, of all cultures, endeavored to find a balance between native tradition and colonial innovation.

== Format ==
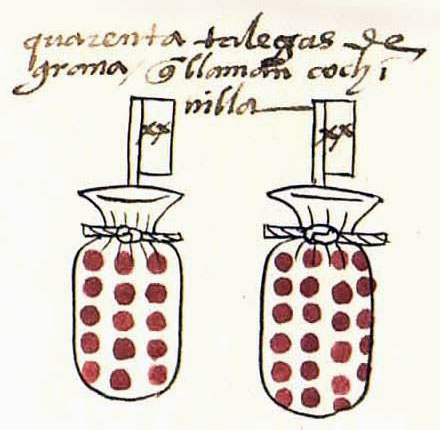
Cochineal dye depicted in the Codex Mendoza folio 43r

The codex is crafted in the native style using natural pigments and ink, as well as more advanced techniques learned from the Spanish colonists. Folios 94-104 were created with the traditional naturally-sourced color palettes of pre-European codices: red from the cochineal insect, yellow from tecoçahuitl stones and flowering plants, black from tree sap and charcoal, green from trees and native brush plants, blue from flowering herbs, and various more muted shades derived from crushing and moistening minerals. In folios 105–112, European influence is evident in the advancements in the rendering of forms seen in the depictions of various rulers and deities of Texcoco, elevated saturations of pigment, the usage of applied gold leaf on ornamental details, and the usage of European paper as opposed to the bark of wild fig trees. The final folios, 113–122, contain no imagery, and are made exclusively with European ink. The codex amounts to 27 total pages of European paper, and contains 29 total visual illustrations.The physical manuscript itself roughly measures 21 x 31 centimeters.

== History ==
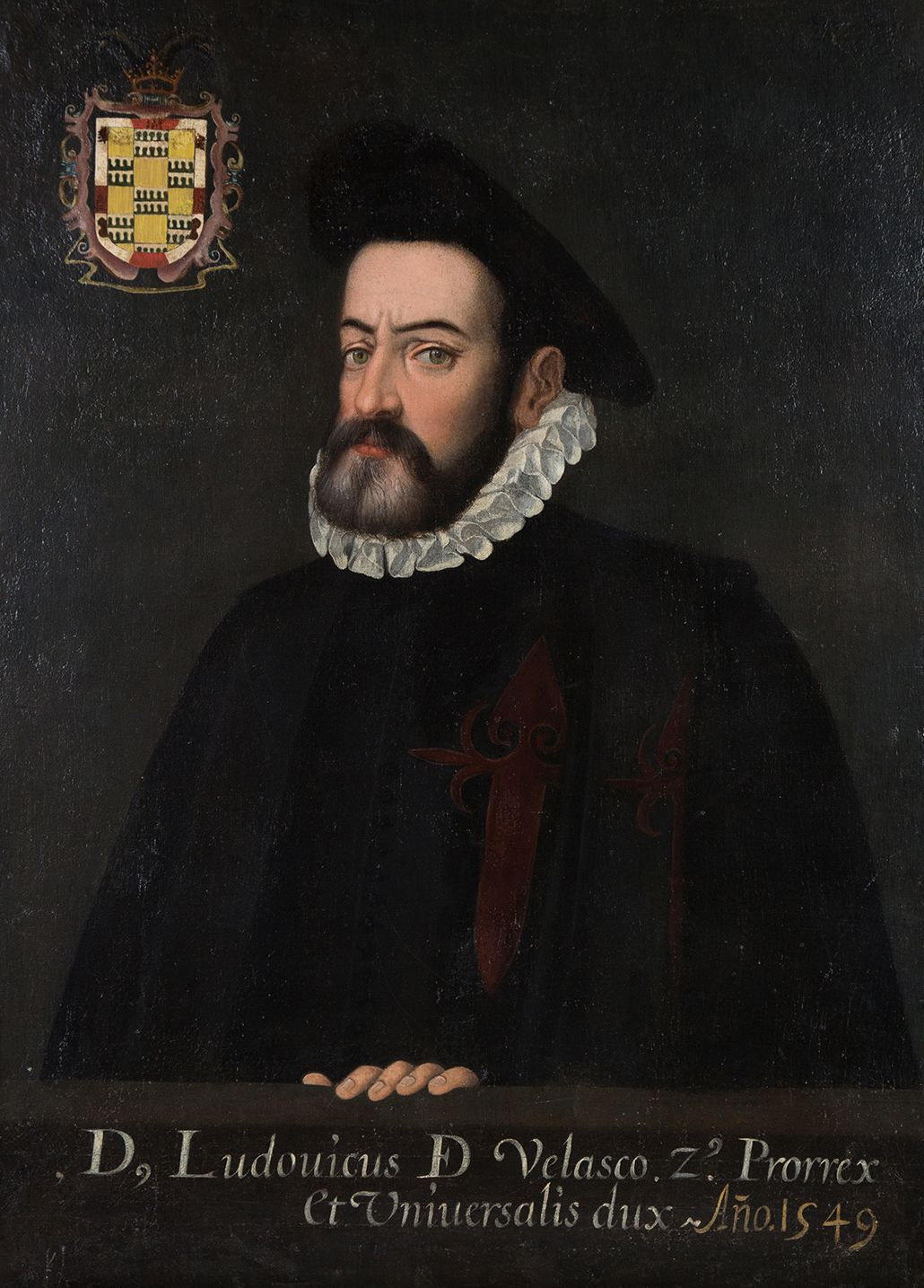
Viceroy Luis De Velasco

While the artists of the individual images are unknown, it can be assumed that they were Aztec natives under the direction of Spanish clergy for the purpose of identifying rituals that were deemed to be sacrilegious by the Spanish Catholics. The codex itself is three of these separate documents, making up distinguishable sections, and was assembled by Fernando de Alva Cortez Ixtlilxochitl (c.1578?–1650) a nobleman and historian of esteemed status due to his direct descent from Ixtlilxochitl I and Ixtlilxochitl II, who had been tlatoani (rulers) of the altepetl (city-state) of Texcoco. The attribution of numerous historical chronicles to him was a result of his role as a government-sanctioned archivist and as well as his skills in interpretation and recording of Aztec culture and language; as a result of his achievements at the Imperial Colegio de Santa Cruz de Tlatelolco, he was commissioned by New Spain's viceroy Luis de Velasco to interpret between Spanish speakers and Nahuatl speakers in matters of government and chronicle in detail the history of the Aztec peoples. The Codex Ixtlilxochitl was a result of this chronicling, and mainly discusses Aztec deities and rulers, as well as religious rituals and their calendric associations.

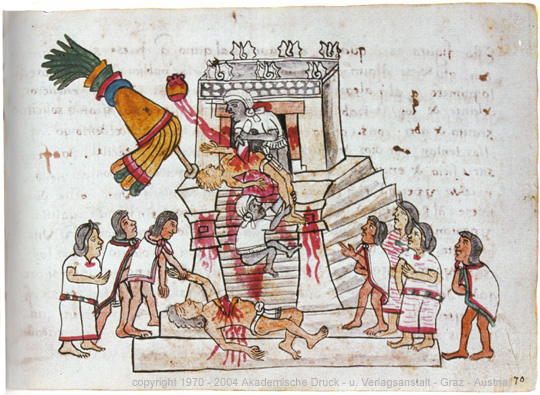
Facsimile from the Codex Magliabechiano

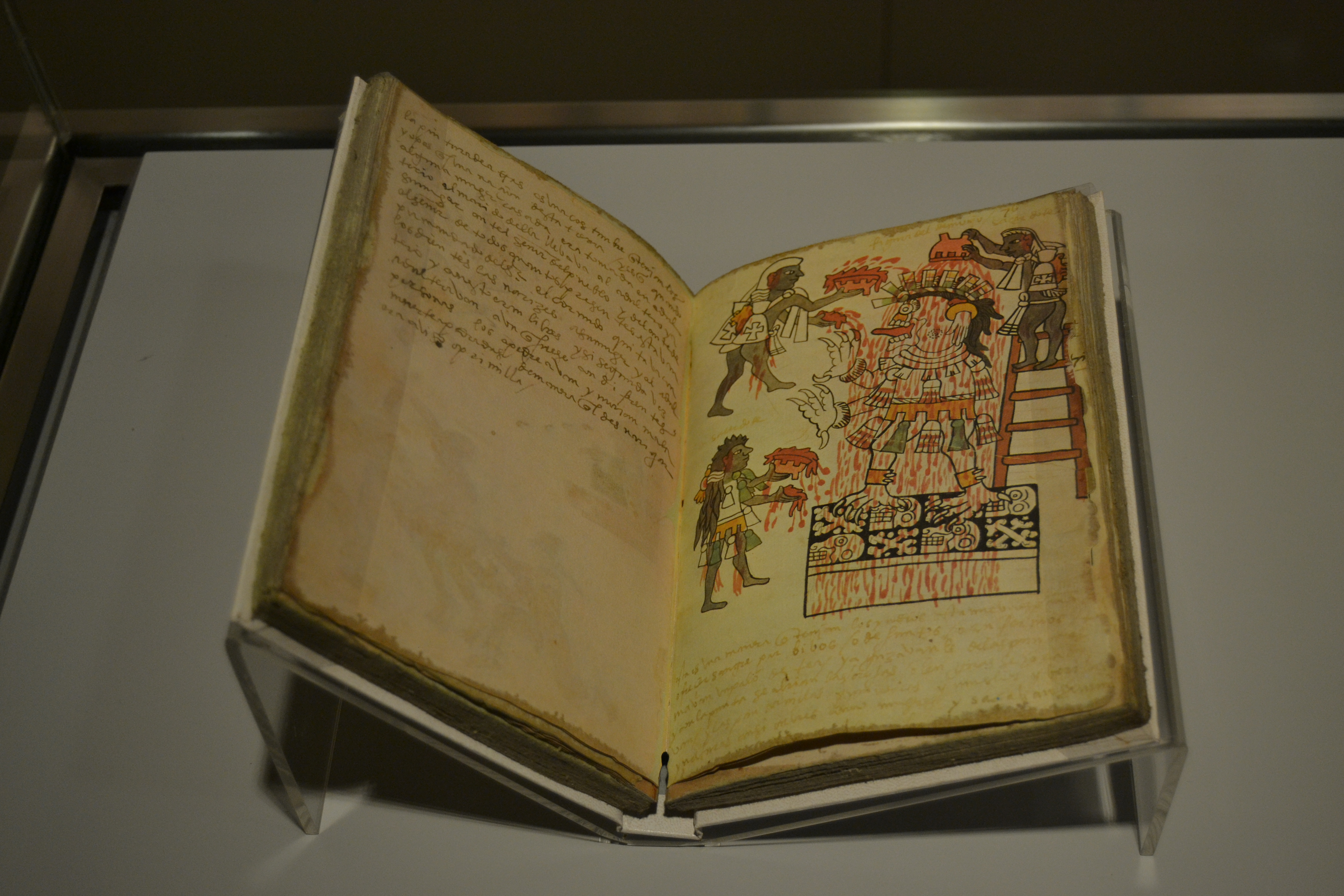
The Codex Tudela in the Museo de América

The codex is a component of the Magliabechiano Group, a set of three codices pertaining to religion and ritual that also includes the Codex Magliabechiano and the Codex Tudela, as well as parts of Crónica de la Nueva España by Francisco Cervantes de Salazar. While other well-known post-colonial Aztec codices mostly document native life in Tenochtitlan, the largest city in the Aztec empire and the one that would eventually develop into the modern-day capitol of Mexico City, much of the content of the Codex Ixtlilxochitl is associated with life in Texcoco and offers a more diverse perspective on day-to-day living in other Aztec regions. While the driving force behind the creation of Spanish-commissioned codices was to serve as aid in converting natives to Catholicism and exterminating the Aztec religion and culture, the Codex Ixtlilxochitl is a tribute to the complex relationship between the colonists and the natives and how that relationship eventually resulted in enough preservation of native practices for historians to have access to a significant wealth of knowledge pertaining to Aztec culture.

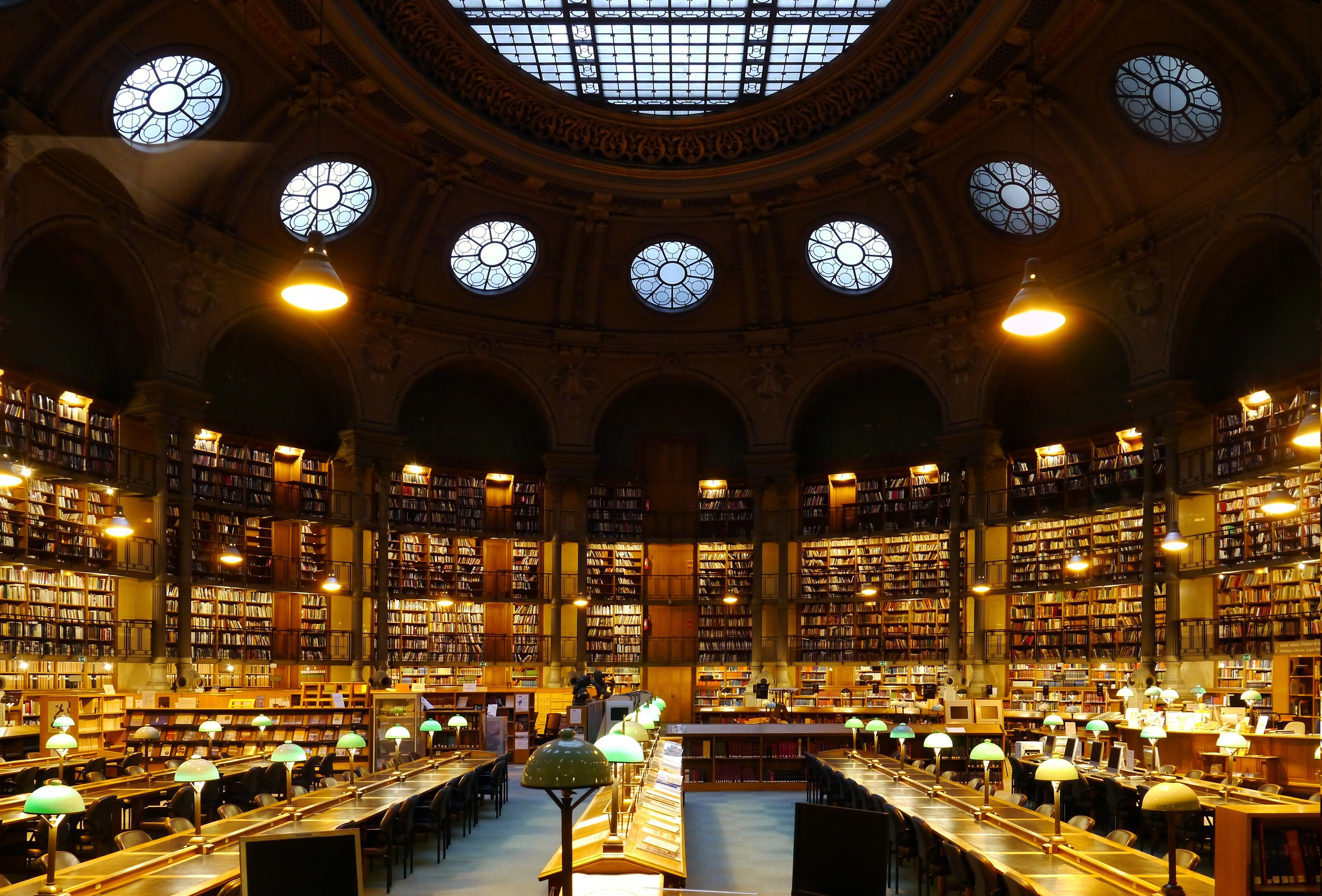
Bibliothèque nationale de France, Paris- currently houses the Codex Ixtlilxochitl

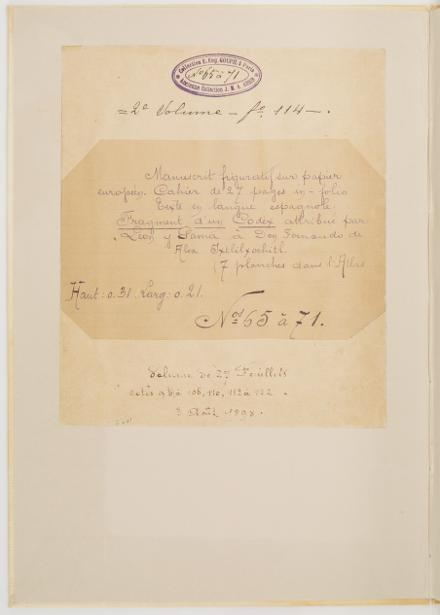
Cataloging stamps seen on the title page of the Codex Ixtlilxochitl

After the codex's arrival in Europe and its application to Spanish census questionnaires, it passed through the hands of various Mexican and European historians and collectors before eventually coming into the possession of Mexican-French collector and philanthropist E. Eugene Goupil. Following Goupil's death in 1895, his estate donated the codex to the Bibliothèque Nationale of Paris, where it continues to reside today. The pages of the codex bear the cataloguing stamps of the Bibliothèque Nationale, Goupil's extensive personal library, as well as page numbers inscribed early in the codex's circulation by previous owners.

== Sections ==
=== Section 1 ===
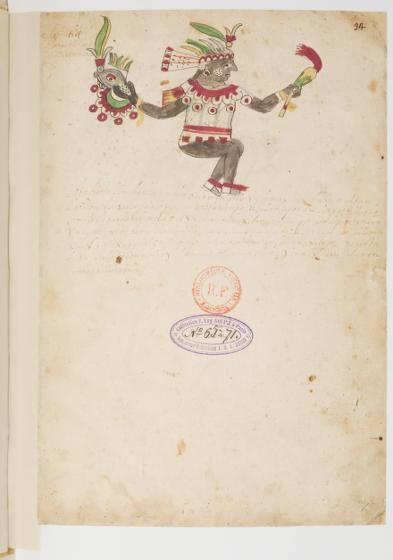
The depiction of the month Atlcahualo from the Aztec Codex Ixtlilxochitl

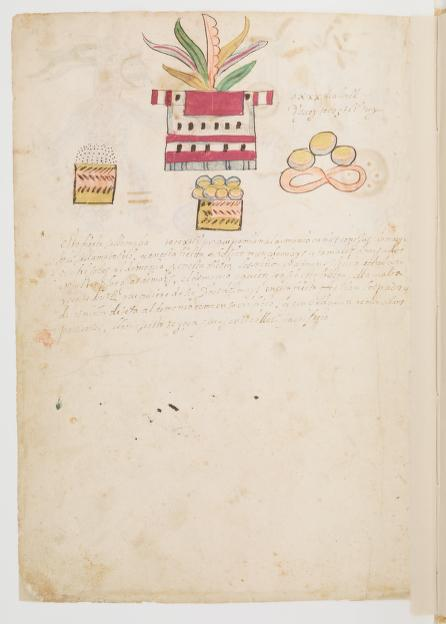
The month Tozoztontli from the Codex Ixtlilxochitl

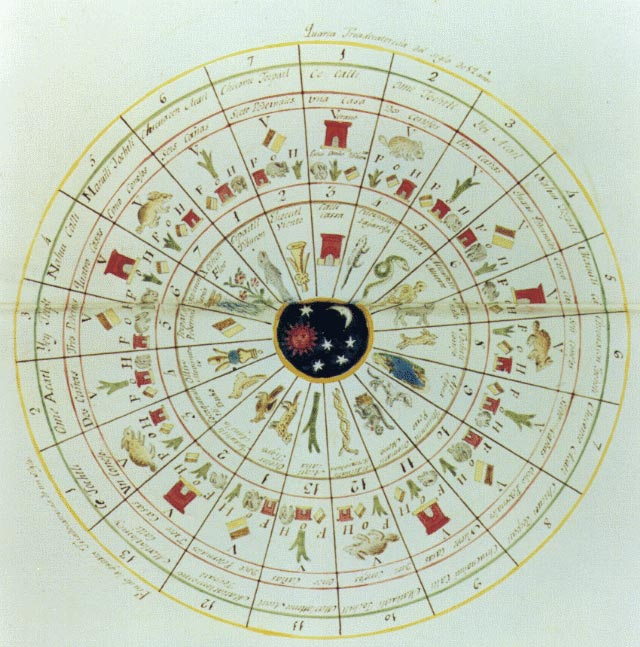
Diagram of a complete Tonalpohualli from an unknown codex

The first section, which comprises folios 94–104, is an artist's copy of an earlier calendrical documentation of revered deities and holidays that occurred at Texcoco's Great Teocalli, or ceremonial temple. The preceding manuscript, known as the Magliabechiano Prototype, was made between 1529 and 1553 but was later lost and is preserved in part within the first section of the Codex Ixtlilxochitl. The codex's containment of this prototype is what cements it as a component of the Magliabechiano Group, which are associated together as they all contain copies of the lost prototype.

The aspects of the prototype preserved in the Codex Ixtlilxochitl present the solar Xiuhpohualli calendar, which is a 365-day calendar consisting of 18 months of 20 days called veintenas in Spanish or mētztli in Nahuatl, as well as each month's associated feast. At the end of the 18 months is a 5-day period called the nemontemi, which were considered to be "unlucky" days separated from the rest of the calendar, during which many day-to-day activities were abstained from at the risk of attracting bad luck or misfortune. Each folio represents a month with a pictogram, ranging from the month Atlcahualo's human figure representative to the month Tozoztontli's garment representative to animal and building and food representatives. Beneath each pictogram is commentary written by Spanish historians from around 1600. Also included in this section of the codex are descriptions of two mortuary rituals.

=== Section 2 ===
Consisting of folios 105–112, this section contains a compilation of illustrations intended to accompany Juan Bautista Pomar's 1577 manuscript Relación de Texcoco, a commissioned census made in response to the Relaciones geográficas questionnaire distributed to the colonies under the rule of King Philip II of Spain as a component of the reforms mandated by the 1573 Ordenanzas. The questionnaires consisted of an elaborate collection of surveys sent to Spanish colonies intended to facilitate a deeper understanding of native culture, religion, and lifestyle practices to more effectively commission government systems. The response included in the Codex Ixtlilxochitl was completed in 1582, and contains six ornately illustrated images as well as written Spanish annotations.

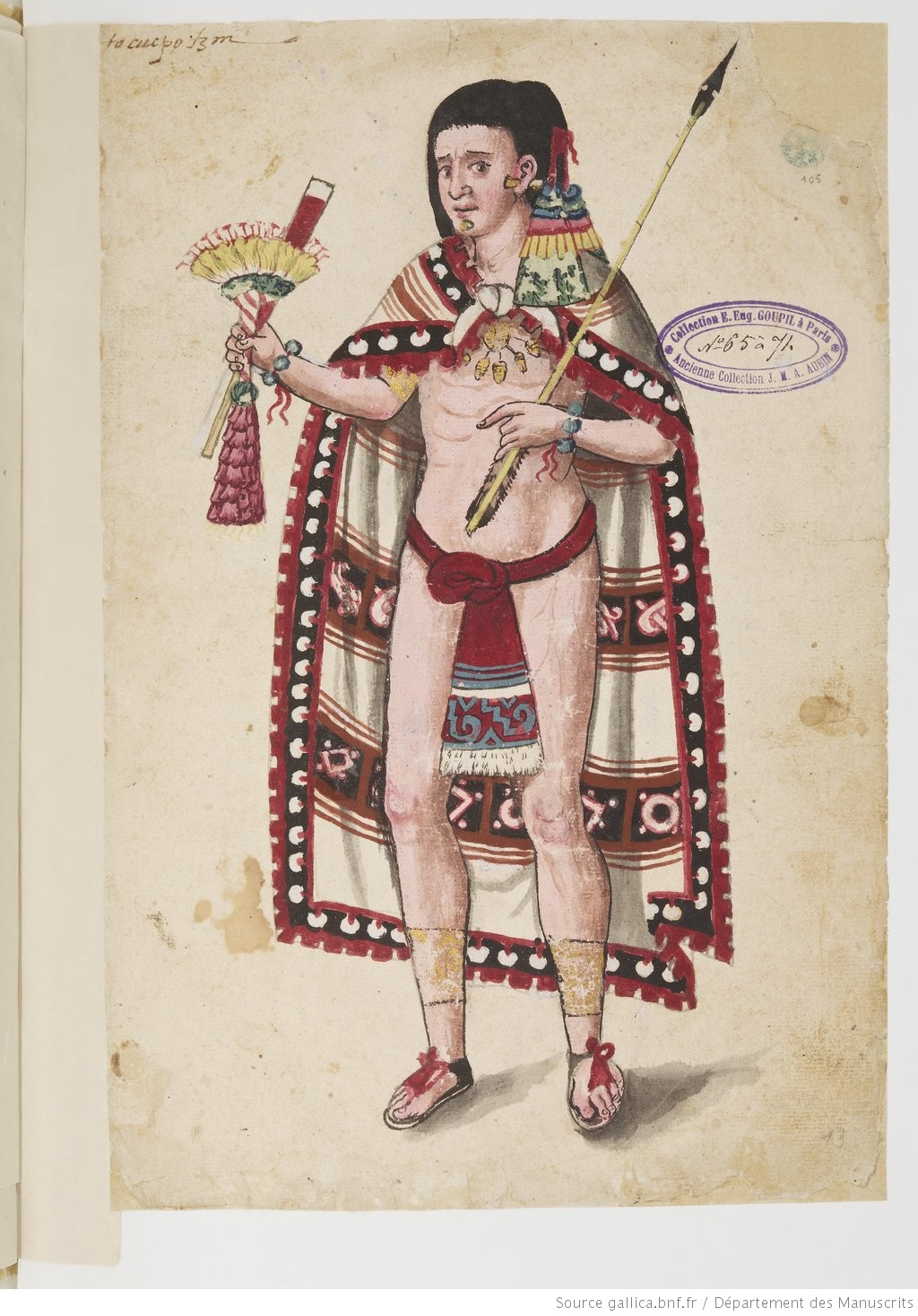
Section 2, illustration 1; Tocuepotzin

In this section, the European influence on Native depictions of deities and rulers within codices is most evident; the figures are rendered with accurate proportions and realistic expressions, and care is taken with anatomical shading in order to create a lifelike image. The painted individuals are identified by alphabetic glosses added by historian Fernando de Alva Ixtlilxóchitl. The first illustration depicts a nobleman named Tocuepotzin, a figure who is otherwise unknown. The folio's illustration depicts him standing upright in regal garb, wearing an elaborately woven textile cloak and holding an arrow in his left hand and a ceremonial floral and feathered scepter in his right hand, along with bracelets made of blue-green stones, possibly turquoise or jade.

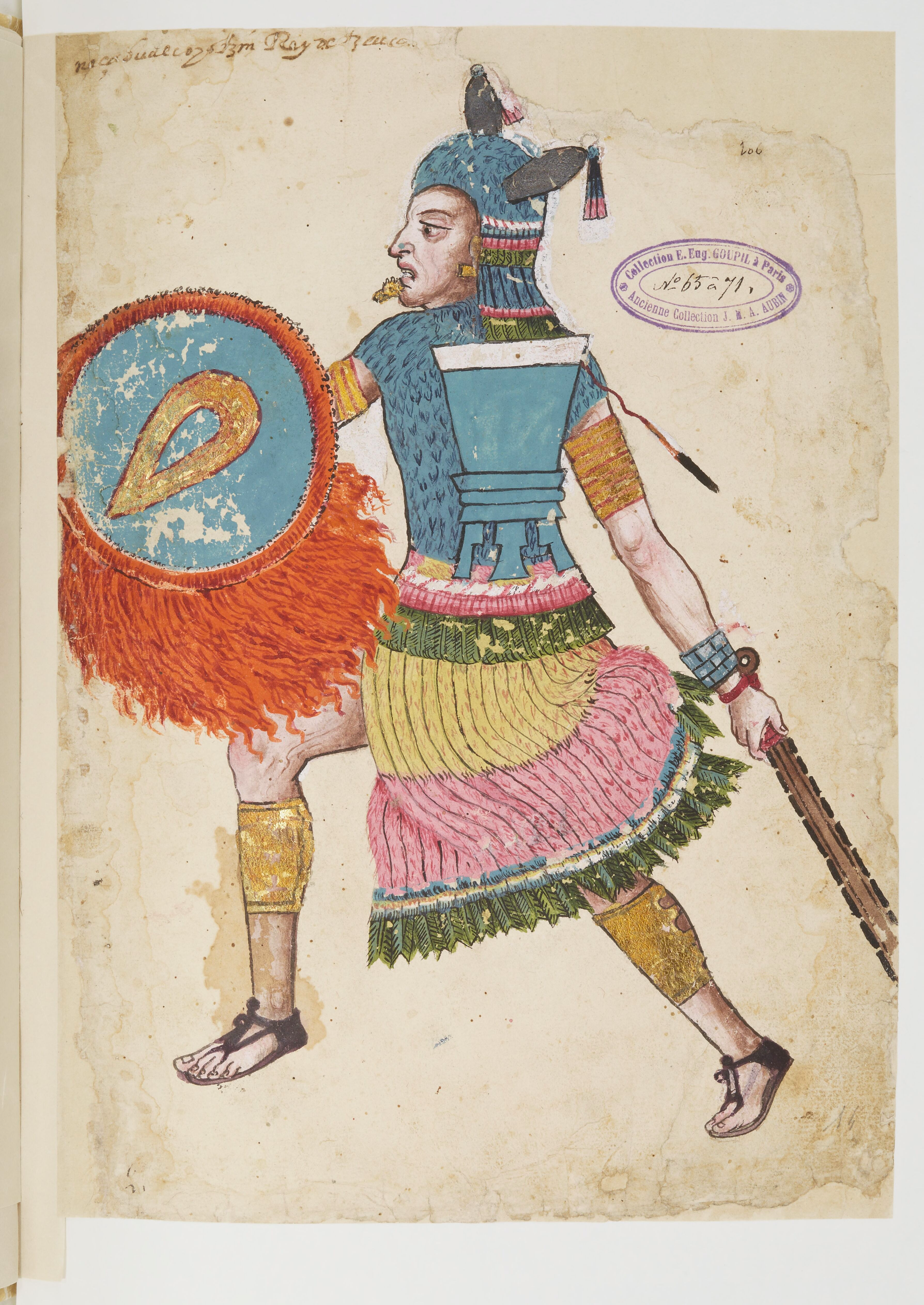
Section 2, illustration 2; Nezahualcoyotl in battle regalia

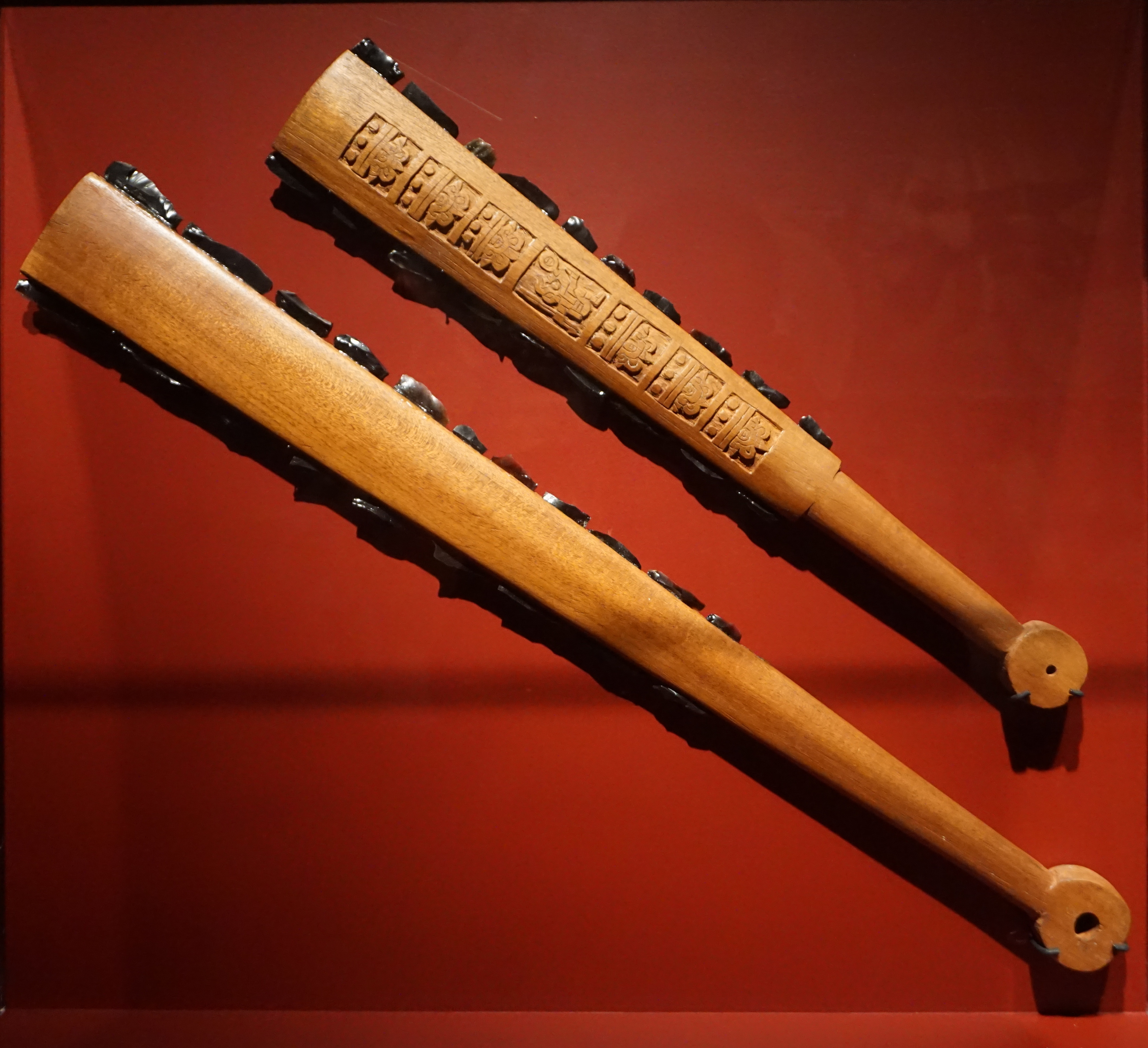
Recreated Macuahuitl made in 2019 by Jose Antonio Casanova Meneses

Nezahualcoyotl, the "Poet-King" of Texcoco who ruled during the 15th century (decades before this portrait was painted), himself is next depicted in this section of the codex, shown fully costumed for battle, seen from a profile point of view running into battle. His battle regalia is made of feathers from tropical birds, which were deemed as precious and of great value by the peoples of Mesoamerica. He holds a macuahuitl (or macana), a type of sword with obsidian blades attached, with his right hand, and a chimalli (shield) with his left hand; this shield, decorated with colourful feathers, bears close resemblance to surviving shields that were sent to Europe in the 16th century. Denoting his high status, he is shown with arm and leg bands made of gold. The depiction of Nezahualcoyotl in his battle attire may have been the result of European fascination with military attire in general. The questionnaire of the Relaciones geográficas specifically asks "What was their battle dress and clothing like, both formerly and now?", and prints of military attire in Europe were known to have been in circulation during the 16th century.

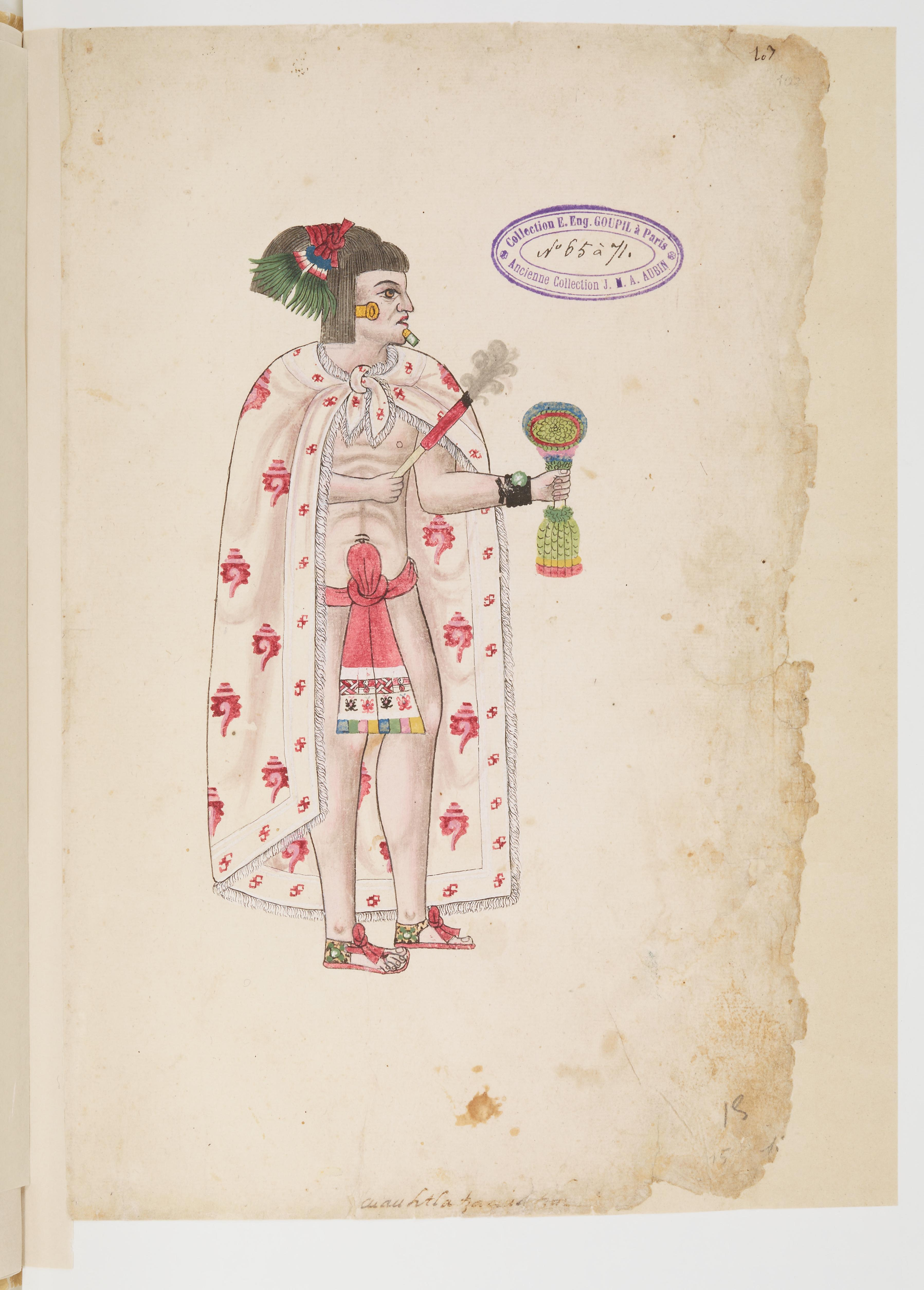
Section 2, illustration 3; Cuauhtlatzacuilotzin, son of Nezahualcoyotl and lord of Chiauhtla

The third illustration depicts Cuauhtlatzacuilotzin (lit. "Wooden Door" in Nahuatl, from cuahuitl, "wood," and tlatzacuilotl, "door"), one of the many sons of king Nezahualcoyotl and ruler of the city of Chiauhtla. Fernando de Alva Ixtlilxóchitl, who, in addition to being a historian, was one of Nezahualcoyotl's direct descendants, also describes him as one of Nezahualcoyotl's biographers, and Alva Ixtlilxóchitl cites his annals as one of his primary sources for his Historia chichimeca (Chichimec History). This nobleman is also depicted in another 16th-century manuscript, the Mapa Quinatzin, from the 1540s, where he is identified as one of the lords sitting at the central courtyard of Nezahualcoyotl's palace, forming part of the Council of Acolhuacan.

The fourth picture illustrates the tlatoani Nezahualpilli, son of Nezahualcoyotl, and is likely the most referenced and recognizable folio of the Codex Ixtlilxochitl as a whole thanks to its depiction of Nezahualpilli's elaborately patterned xiuhtlalpiltilmatl, or "turquoise-tied-mantle," about which there is a degree of controversy surrounding the material with which the cloak was made. Shown also with gold-leaf arm and calf bands, a maxtlatl, or loincloth bearing the same pattern as the mantle, and feathered incense holders, the image depicts Nezahualpilli in a way visually characteristic to his reputation of being a fair, peaceful ruler; alongside that, according to Aztec legends he had divinatory gifts and predicted the arrival of the conquistadors and subsequent fall of the Aztec Empire under Montezuma II's reign.

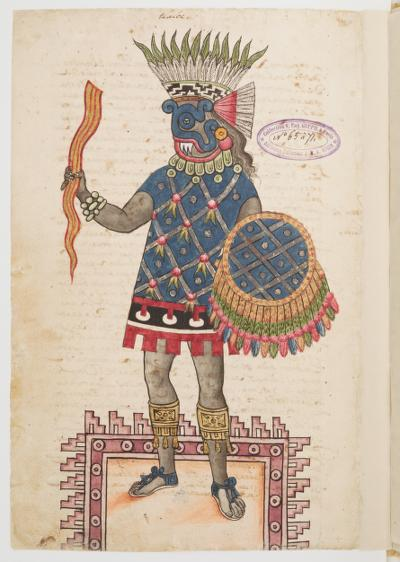
Section 2, illustration 5; Tlaloc

The fifth image diverges from the depiction of emperors of Texcoco, and instead is an ornate illustration of the rain god Tlaloc. Tlaloc, who had jurisdiction over agricultural fertility and crop outcomes, was one of the most significant and revered gods in Aztec religion and culture, and is depicted in this folio wearing his usual unique fanged mask and holding a lightning bolt in his right hand and a feathered shield in his left. The Tlaloc painting was painted by the same artist as Nezahualpilli's portrait. This artist exhibits a great degree of artistic skill, identifying him as a "master of Renaissance-style illusionistic rendering."

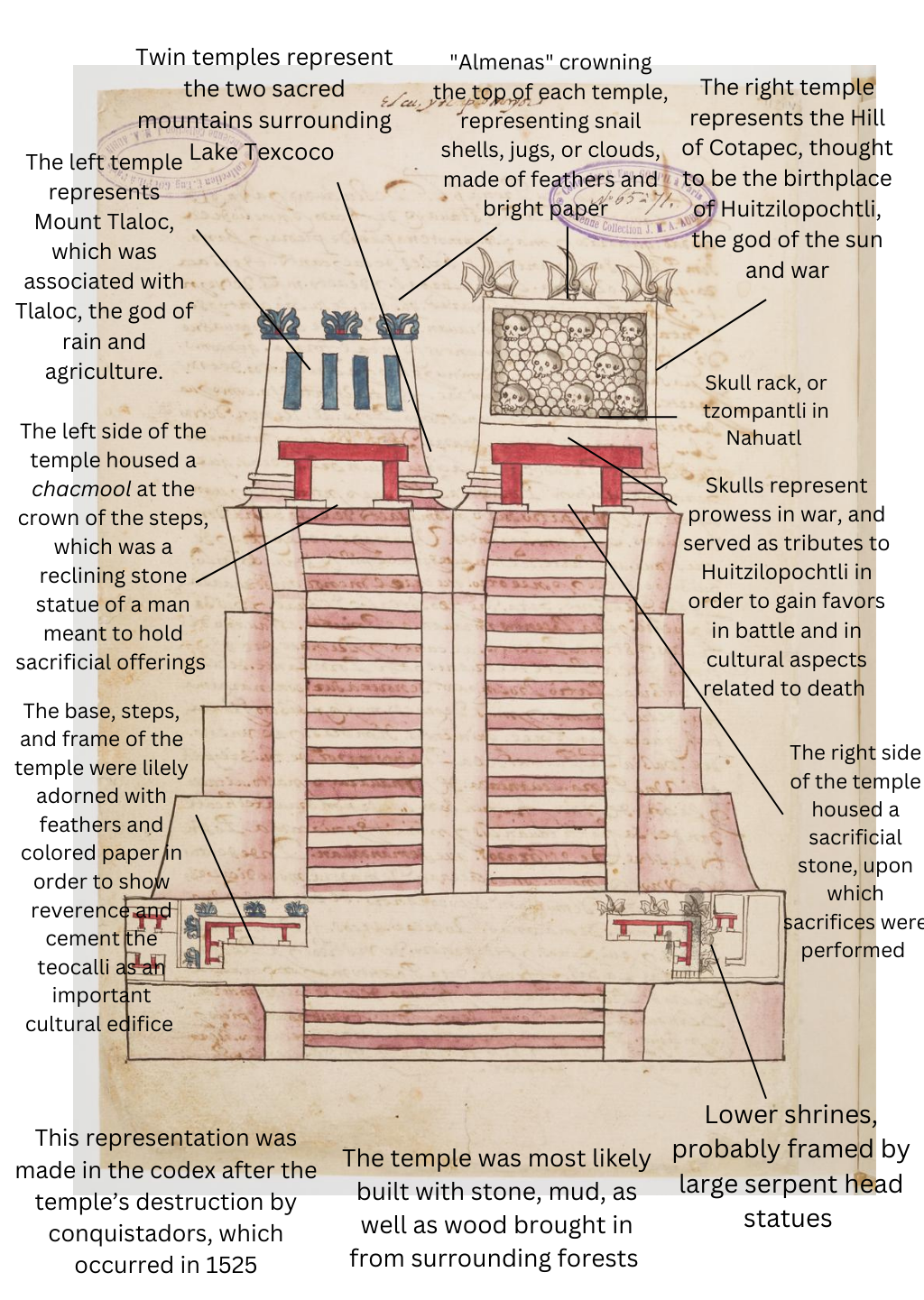
Illustration 7 with annotations regarding the role of the Teocalli in the culture of Texcoco

Finally, the sixth image illustrates Texcoco's great teocalli, the double-templed pyramid at which many religious ceremonies and cultural events took place. This specific depiction of the teocalli is often used in reference to Tenochtitlan's Templo Mayor, possibly due to its academic clarity in terms of the artist's usage of line and color, but is in fact Texcoco's equivalent of Tenochtitlan's teocalli. Most Aztec cities possessed a grand central temple for ceremonial usage, and the comparability of Texcoco's and Tenochtitlan's teocallis has a tendency to confuse historians and casual observers despite the fact that they were two entirely different temples.

=== Section 3 ===
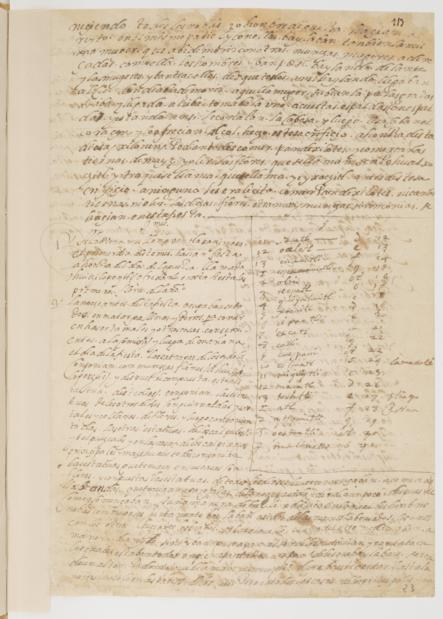
Facsimile displaying an example of the Spanish script

Folios 113-122 are an assembly of unillustrated notes and textual analyses regarding the Aztec ceremonial calendar outlined visually in the first section of the codex. Thought to be written by de Alva Cortez Ixtlilxochitl himself to aid the European understanding of Aztec ritualistic practices and their calendrical associations, the text is simply formatted, written entirely in Spanish, and echos much of the written Spanish annotations found in the first section of the codex in a more comprehensive fashion, as well as sharing similarities with other written accounts of Aztec calendars by other European historians and census writers.

== Depiction of Nezahualpilli's Cloak ==
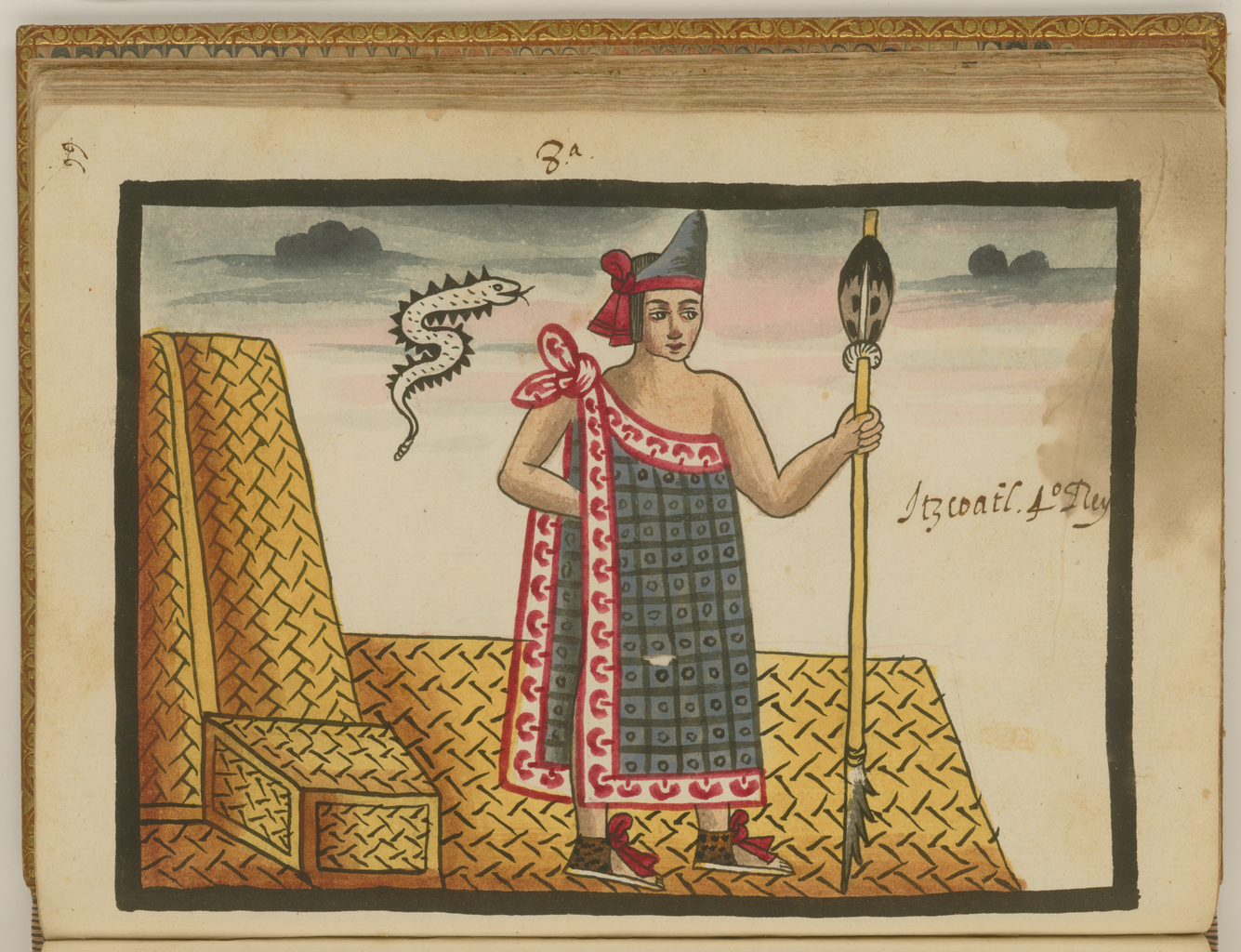
- Depiction of the "diaper" pattern from the Codex Tovar
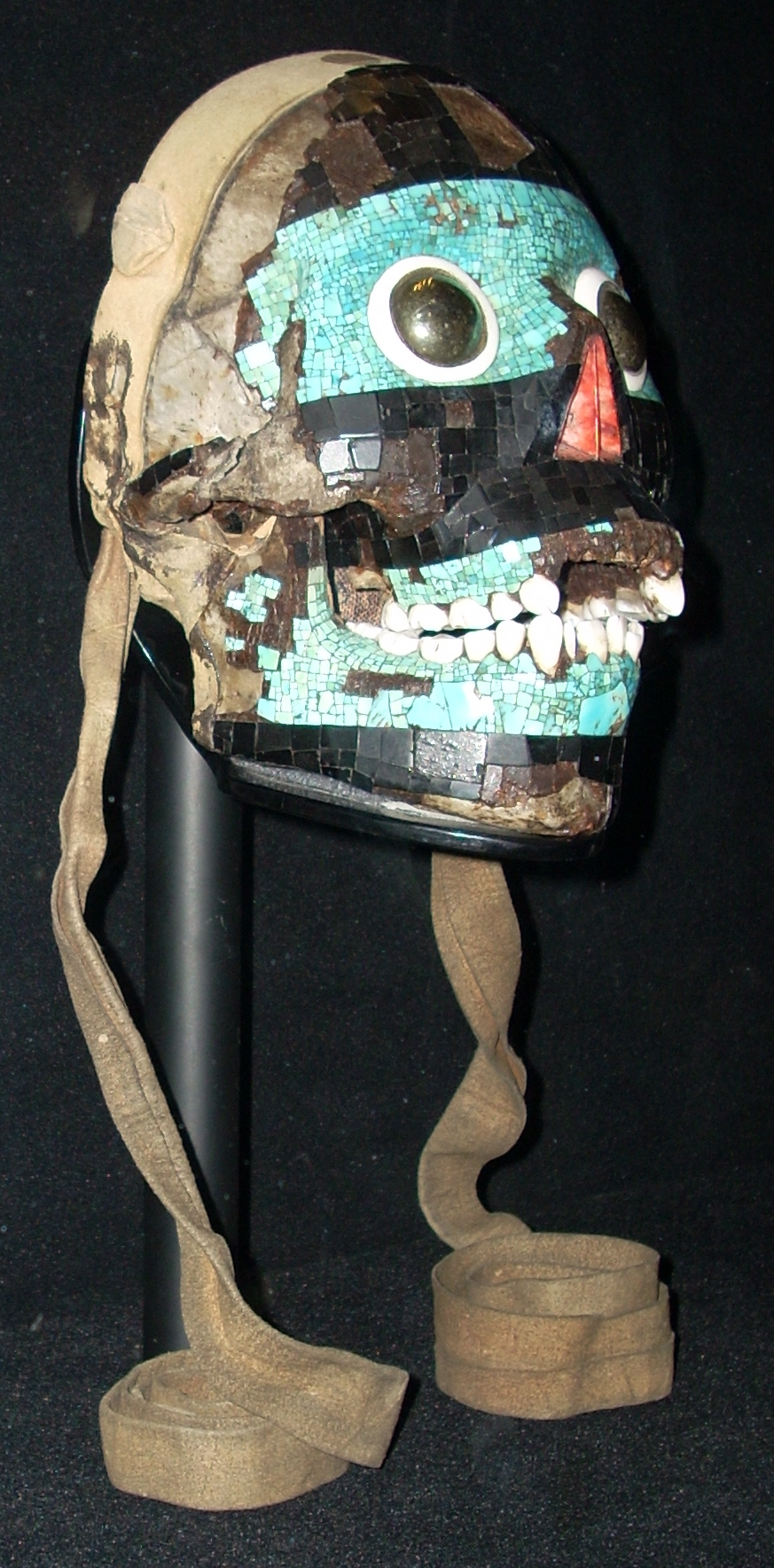
  Turquoise tiles inlaid onto the Mixtec Tezcatlipoca mask
  The ornate illustration of the tlatoani Nezahualpilli's elaborate mantle on folio 108 is subject to a large degree of attention and debate; the cloak's "diaper" design, called xiuhtlalpilli, or “blue-knotted" in Nahuatl, has long since been the subject of speculation concerning its material and method of creation. Two hypotheses exist amongst historians: according to research presented by historian Patricia Anawalt in her article The Emperors' Cloak: Aztec Pomp, Toltec Circumstances, the design was created on cotton using a tie-dye or batik-like technique, however numerous attempts to recreate this to any degree of plausible accuracy have failed. The opposing hypothesis, heralded by Carmen Aguilera in her article Of Royal Mantles and Blue Turquoise: The Meaning of the Mexica Emperor's Mantle, suggests that, in keeping with the traditionally ornate garments worn by Aztec nobility, the design was created by studding or embroidering turquoise tiles and beads onto a net base made of plant fiber. A consensus as to which is the most plausible option between these two has not yet been reached, and even the name of the mantle in Nahuatl contributes to the debate- Anawalt believes the "knotted" portion of the name was likely in reference to the hypothetical knots made during the dying process, and Aguilera suggests that "knotted" refers to the method of attaching tiles to the fiber net.
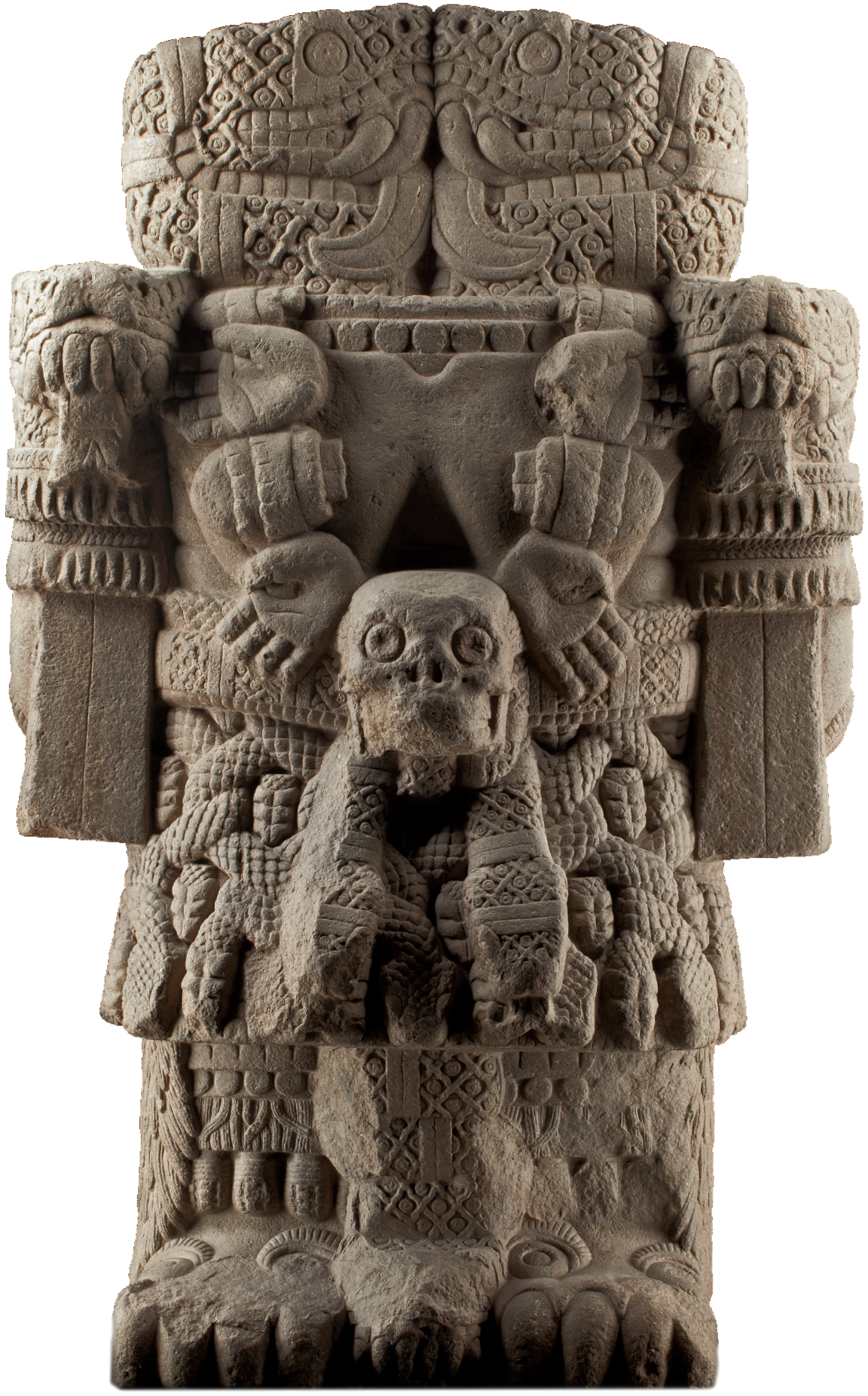
- Coatlicue (Snakes-in-her-skirt)
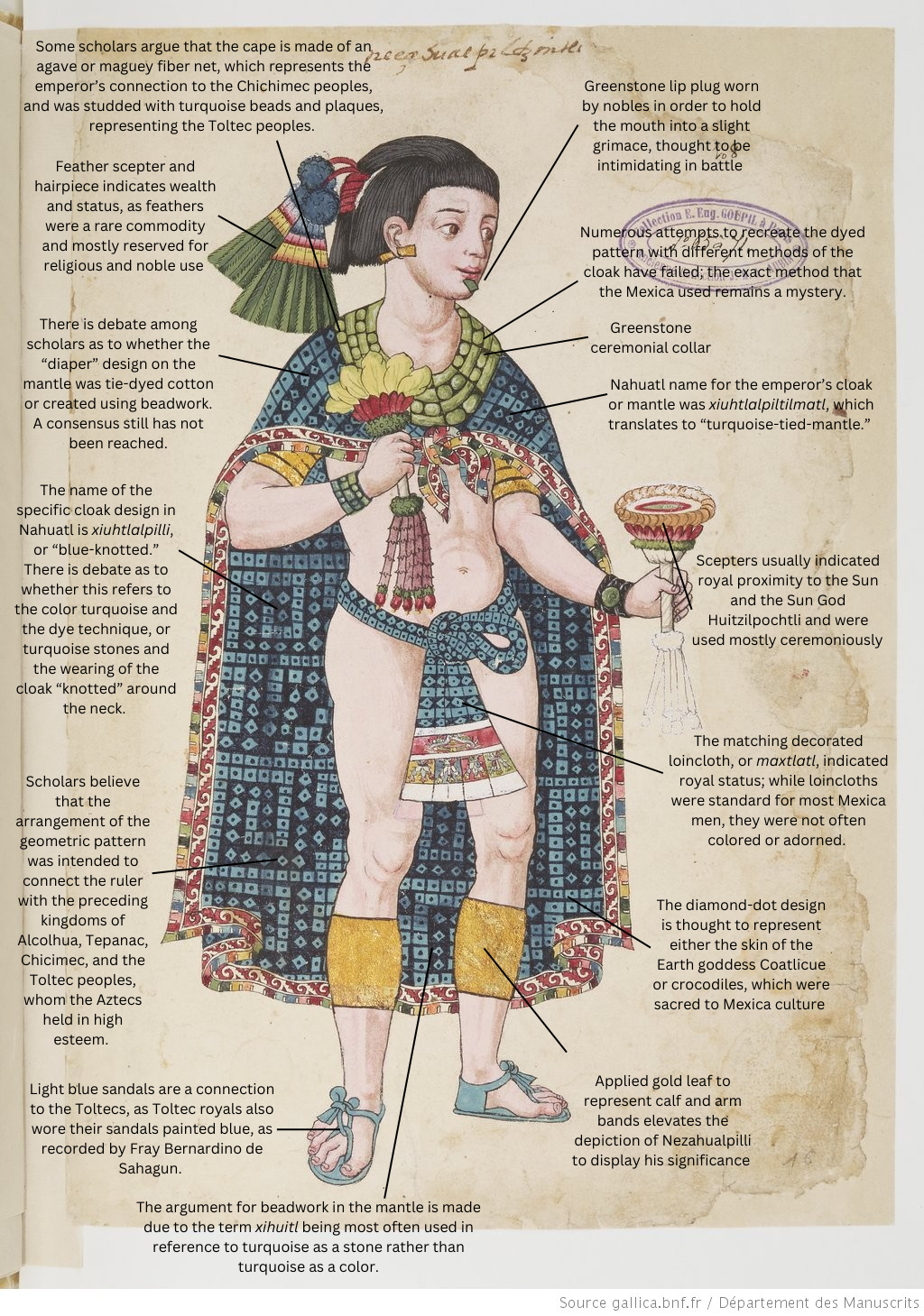
  Annotated notes on the cloak of Nezahualpilli
  The diamond-dot pattern itself is thought to represent either the skin of the earth goddess Coatlicue, or the skin of crocodiles which were regarded as sacred creatures within the Aztec culture. The arrangement of the pattern is arrayed in reference to patterns associated with the Alcolhua, Tepanac, Chicimec, and Toltec civilizations, all of which preceded the Aztecs chronologically and were held to an almost mythical esteem in Aztec society, with emphasis on the Toltec peoples. The Aztec tlatoani was expected to be a direct descendant of the Toltec royal dynasty in order to ascend to the throne, and by wearing a mantle with patterns associated with the preceding societies, the emperor in question establishes himself as connected to the past and therefore possesses a divine right to rule. Additionally, the relatively small number of garment components worn by Ixtlilxochitl I, Nezahualcoyotl, and Nezahualpilli in their depictions in the Codex Ixtlilxochitl are thought to be in reference to the minimalism of Toltec culture; it wasn't until the reign of tlatoani Itzcoatl that the Aztecs were able to facilitate trade systems that afforded them more elaborate styles of dressing, and by dressing only in the traditional mantle and loincloth for royal ceremonies they paid homage to the regalia and manner of dressing of their ancestors.

== See also ==
- Texcoco altepetl- city-state of which the Codex Ixtlilxochitl was concerned
- Fernando de Alva Cortez Ixtlilxochitl- assumed assembler of the codex, and nobleman and historian of partial Aztec descent
- Codex Magliabechiano and Codex Tudela- other two components of the three-codex Magliabechiano Group
- Xiuhpohualli- calendar depicted in Section 1 of the Codex Ixtlilxochitl
- Ixtlilxochitl I- tlatoani of Texcoco depicted in folio 105 and 107
- Nezahualcoyotl- tlatoani of Texcoco depicted in folio 106
- Nezahualpilli- tlatoani of Texcoco depicted in folio 108
- Tlaloc- rain deity depicted in folio 110
- Teocalli- central religious temple depicted in folio 112
- Toltec- pre-Columbian Mesoamerican culture that heavily influenced the later Aztec culture
