= Nezahualcoyotl (tlatoani) =

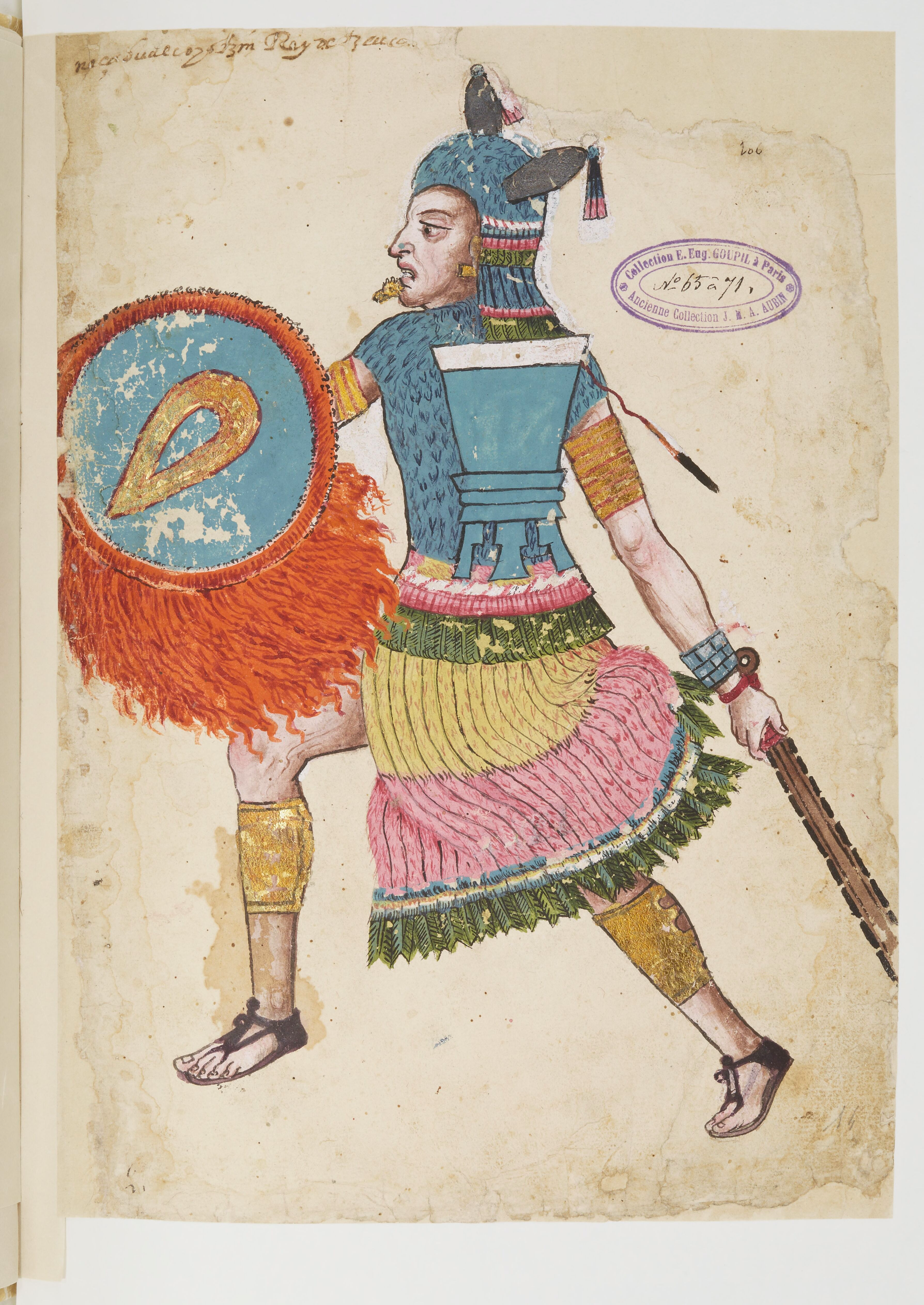
- Posthumous portrait of Nezahualcoyotl in battle regalia, in the 16th-century Codex Ixtlilxochitl.

Tlatoani of Texcoco
- Reign: 1431–1472
- Predecessor: Ixtlilxochitl I
- Successor: Nezahualpilli
- Born: April 28, 1402; Texcoco
- Died: 1472 (aged 69–70); Texcoco
- Spouse: Azcalxochitzin
- Issue among others...: Nezahualpilli; Tetzauhpiltzintli; Xochiquetzaltzin; Acamapipioltzin
- Father: Ixtlilxochitl I
- Mother: Matlalcihuatzin

Nezahualcoyotl Acolmiztli (Classical Nahuatl: Nezahualcoyōtl [nesawalˈkojoːtɬ], modern Nahuatl pronunciation), "Fasting Coyote" (April 28, 1402 – 1472) was tlatoani (king) of the Acolhua altepetl (city-state) of Texcoco from 1431 to his death in 1472, in pre-Columbian Mexico. He is noted for his achievements as a philosopher (tlamatini), warrior, architect, legislator and poet, earning him the nickname of "the Poet-King" (Rey Poeta, in Spanish). In his lifetime, he was also known by his poetic nickname Yoyontzin. His difficult younger years following his father's assassination, and his efforts to reconquer his realm after being taken over by the powerful Tepanec Empire turned him into a hero in pre-Columbian society. In order to defeat the Tepanec Empire, and its ruler Maxtla, he formed an alliance with the tlatoque (kings) of Mexico-Tenochtitlan and Tlacopan (Itzcoatl and Totoquihuaztli I), becoming one of the founders of the Aztec Triple Alliance, commonly known as the Aztec Empire. His odyssey has captured the public imagination, which has been compared to the Shakespearean story of Prince Hamlet, albeit he remains an enigmatic figure, due to the lack of sources from his own lifetime or from his contemporaries.

He was the legitimate son of Ixtlilxochitl I, the king of Texcoco who declared war on the Tepanec Empire approximately in 1415. Nezahualcoyotl was declared crown prince soon after the war started, and about four years later, when he was just 16 years old, he witnessed his father being assassinated by Tepanec warriors while attempting to flee Texcoco. Nezahualcoyotl spent several years of his life in exile, seeking refuge in Tlaxcallan and Tenochtitlan and evading assassination attempts. Following the death of the Tepanec emperor Tezozomoc, Maxtla took the throne and attempted to assassinate Nezahualcoyotl on multiple occasions, unsuccessfully. When Chimalpopoca, king of Tenochtitlan (and Nezahualcoyotl's uncle), was assassinated in 1427, Itzcoatl, his successor, launched a revolution to end Tepanec rule over Mexico. He and Nezahualcoyotl formed an alliance to defeat the Tepanecas, and after a series of combats, they managed to overthrow Maxtla, killing him and destroying the Tepanec Empire. With Itzcoatl's support, Nezahualcoyotl formally took Texcoco's throne in 1431, beginning a period of prosperity that would last until the 16th century.

He is credited with starting Texcoco's golden age. During his reign, Nezahualcoyotl led the construction of massive and impressive engineering projects, with a particular focus on hydraulic engineering, building aqueducts, flood-preventing structures and botanical gardens which worked for the benefit of the population of the Valley of Mexico for decades after his death. The remains of the botanical gardens of Texcotzingo serve as physical evidence of the impressive engineering skill and appreciation for nature the people of Texcoco developed during his rule. He also established a Hammurabi-like legal system consisting of 80 laws addressing matters such as robbery, adultery, military misconduct and more. Through conquest, Nezahualcoyotl managed to expand his realm's territory beyond that which his predecessors had ruled; his conquests were done along side the conquests of the rulers of Tenochtitlan (Itzcoatl, Moctezuma I and Axayacatl). Texcoco became a respected nation by its neighbors in the Valley of Mexico, being observed as a hub of intellectuals, engineers and legal experts, though the violence of his conquests is reflected in songs from the regions he attacked.

In the present, Nezahualcoyotl is best remembered for his poetry and the philosophical ideas reflected in the surviving works attributed to him. His poems address themes such as the ephemerality of human life and the "eternal" nature of "flower and song." Such poems continue being taught to Mexican children at schools, and have been praised for their beauty for centuries, in spite of the destruction of indigenous literature following the Spanish conquest of Mexico. Throughout the centuries following his death, many writers in Mexico and elsewhere wrote about his achievements, poetry and prosperous reign. Nevertheless, he has also been the subject of multiple myths and legends that may not be historically accurate. The very authorship of the poems historically attributed to him has been a subject of intense debate among scholars of Aztec culture, and it is believed that various elements of his biography may have been exaggerated to create a heroic narrative. Regardless, his biography was recorded on multiple pictorial documents, known as codices, and after the Spanish conquest it was preserved by his descendants and multiple historians who had access to these codices. Historians since the 19th century have referred to Nezahualcoyotl as a "Renaissance man of Aztec culture," and have compared Texcoco during his reign to Classical Athens.

== Name ==
Pre-Hispanic glyph of Nezahualcoyotl. Note the nezahualli or fasting collar.

The Nahuatl name Nezahualcoyotl is commonly translated as "Hungry Coyote" or "Fasting Coyote". More accurately, it means "Coyote With a Fasting Collar", from nezahualli, meaning a collar made out of bands of paper twisted together. Collars of this kind were worn by those fasting to show others that they should not be offered food. William H. Prescott, who translates his name to "Hungry Fox", believes that Nezahualcoyotl gave himself this name in reference to his cunning, but also to the hardships he endured during the early years of his life. In various poetic compositions, Nezahualcoyotl is referred to as Yoyontzin, a nickname used by himself and others.

== Historical sources ==
=== Pictorial documents ===
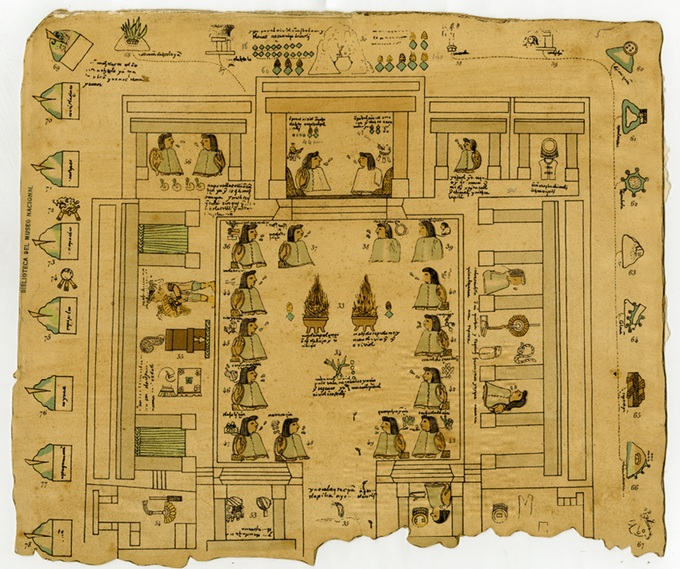
Plan of Nezahualcoyotl's palace, depicted on leaf 2 of the Mapa Quinatzin (1891 reproduction).

One of the most important primary sources we possess to understand the history of pre-Columbian Texcoco is a manuscript painted sometime in the early 1540s, during the early colonial period in Mesoamerican history, known as the Codex Xolotl. It is a cartographic history document made in Texcoco, described by historian Lorenzo Boturini Benaducci as "a map of exquisite delicacy", as it is the most extensive of three Texcocan cartographic histories known to exist, the other two being the Mapa Quinatzin and the Tlohtzin Map, both of which were also made in the 1540s. An annotation in Spanish attributes the ownership of the Tlohtzin Map to a certain Don Diego Pimentel, who was a descendant of Nezahualcoyotl.

The Codex Xolotl probably adapted or copied from an early 15th-century manuscript which would have been commissioned by Nezahualcoyotl himself as a document to legitimize his rule "through stories about migrations, marriages, births, deaths, dynastic successions, usurpation, battles, treason, ambushes, murders, imprisonment, and so forth." All three of the mentioned documents (Xolotl, Quinatzin and Tlohtzin) are characterized by being written "without words," i.e. in iconic script, though this does not imply they cannot be read, as, while words are not recorded as they would be using an alphabet, they communicate meaning through the textual traditions of the people who made them, as Douglas (2010) finds in his study.

These manuscripts were used by historians such as Fray Juan de Torquemada and Fernando de Alva Ixtlilxóchitl in the 17th century to write a significant number of works, and continued changing hands following Ixtlilxóchitl's death, until ultimately arriving in Europe in the 1840s in the possession of a French scientist profoundly interested in Mexico's past, Joseph Aubin. All three of these manuscripts are currently housed at the Bibliothèque nationale de France.

Analysis of the Codex Xolotl requires careful examination, however, as it was made with the intent of glorifying the descendants of King Xolotl, that is, the dynasty which ruled Texcoco, and thus probably underestimates the merit of other peoples who inhabited the Valley of Mexico who are described in the codex. Moreover, this codex also contributed to the creation of a narrative that turned Nezahualcoyotl into a near-invincible hero, who managed to escape from almost certain death on multiple occasions by outsmarting his adversaries, such as the Tepanec emperor Maxtla. This narrative was subsequently enhanced and exaggerated by later writers who used this codex as a source of information, adding their own narratives onto the already existing heroic tale.

Other pictorial manuscripts depicting some of Nezahualcoyotl's deeds include the Codex en Cruz (a Texcocan source), Codex Azcatitlan (a Mexica source), and the Códice de Xicotepec (another Texcocan source). These three documents in particular depict some of Nezahualcoyotl's conquests and his participation in Mexica conquests during the reign of Moctezuma I.

An enormous number of pre-Columbian manuscripts were destroyed in book burnings on two occasions. The first occurred approximately in 1430, when the ruling elite of Mexico-Tenochtitlan consolidated its power and destroyed old histories for containing "falsehoods" that "could have undermined the realm." The second, more infamous occasion occurred following the Spanish conquest of Mexico in 1521. Spanish missionaries gave themselves the objective of destroying any record that could remind the indigenous peoples of their pre-Christian past, burning the ancient texts in autos-da-fé. Nevertheless, chroniclers after the conquest created new manuscripts which were painted with a pre-Columbian style and adapted from the few ancient books that survived these book burnings.

=== Colonial-era works ===
==== Works of Fernando de Alva Ixtlilxóchitl ====
Fernando de Alva Ixtlilxóchitl, a 17th-century historian who spent much of his life documenting the pre-Columbian history of Texcoco, was a direct descendant of Nezahualcoyotl through his mother's family, and had access to and possession of several pictorial manuscripts documenting the city's history, including the Codex Xolotl, the Mapa Quinatzin, and the Tlohtzin Map, which he likely inherited from his maternal family. He used these documents to write his Spanish-language accounts of Texcoco's history. In addition to these pictorial manuscripts, Ixtlilxóchitl cited, in his History of the Chichimec people (Historia de la nación chichimeca, c. 1625), "the [historical] reports that the infantes [princes] of Tetzcoco, don Pablo, don Toribio, and don Hernando Pimentel [Nezahualcoyotzin], and Juan de Pomar, sons and grandsons of Nezahualpiltzintli, wrote."

Ixtlilxóchitl has been a controversial historian for centuries due to his notorious biases in favor of Texcoco's monarchy. As early as the 17th century, Mexican antiquarian Carlos de Sigüenza y Góngora, who had access to the pictorial manuscripts and to Ixtlilxóchitl's works through the historian's son, had criticized him by writing an annotation in one of his own manuscripts:

El autor de este Compendio histórico de los Reyes de Tetzcoco es Don Fernando de Alva Ixtlilxóchitl, el cual se debe leer con grande cautela, porque por engrandecer a su progenitor Don Fernando Cortés Ixtlilxóchitl señor de Tetzcoco, falta en muchas cosas a la verdad.

[The author of this Historical Compendium of the Kings of Tetzcoco is Don Fernando de Alva Ixtlilxóchitl, and it should be read with great caution, because in his intention to glorify his ancestor Don Fernando Cortés Ixtlilxóchitl, lord of Tetzcoco, it lacks truth in many things.]

— Carlos de Sigüenza y Góngora, Codex Chimalpahin, volume 2, fol. 148r.

Notably, Ixtlilxóchitl insisted that Nezahualcoyotl was one of the foremost philosophers in pre-Hispanic Mesoamerica, and describes him as an "open antagonist" of the indigenous Aztec religion, opposing the practice of human sacrifice which existed at the time and was commonly practiced in the city of Mexico-Tenochtitlan, and as skeptical about the indigenous gods. He, along with another direct descendant of Nezahualcoyotl named Juan Bautista Pomar, claims that such religious and philosophical ideas were represented in the poems attributed to the monarch. Furthermore, Pomar compiled, in the 1580s, many of Nezahualcoyotl's poems in his Romances de los señores de Nueva España as evidence for this claim. Modern historians agree that such ideas described by Pomar and Ixtlilxóchitl are of obvious European origin, and that some poems that were historically attributed to the monarch could not have been produced by him, due to having a nature of thought that is completely foreign to pre-Columbian Mesoamerica. As a consequence of this portrayal of Nezahualcoyotl as a skeptical philosopher, future historians had the tendency of writing about Nezahualcoyotl as a peaceful monarch whose ideas contrasted with the "barbarous" Mexica. Today, it is well understood that Nezahualcoyotl was a powerful warrior king who greatly expanded his kingdom's territory through conquest.

Nevertheless, the importance of Ixtlilxóchitl's work in reconstructing the pre-Columbian past is beyond doubt, and as biased as his points of view were with respect to Texcoco's monarchy, the relevance of his work has been acknowledged by researchers for centuries, such as 19th-century historians José Fernando Ramírez and Alfredo Chavero, even if the latter believed the praise his works received was "exaggerated." Ixtlilxóchitl's work remains the most extensive source of information about Texcoco's history, describing its conflicts and the succession of its rulers over the course of centuries.

==== Codex Chimalpopoca ====
Another notable work from this era is the Codex Chimalpopoca, particularly one of the three sections it contains: the Annals of Cuauhtitlan, dated 1570. The Annals were written in Nahuatl by an anonymous author who went beyond just writing about his own nation (Cuauhtitlan), and built a comprehensive history of the Valley of Mexico. The text is notable for this reason, for the rare histories of several cities, and for its lengthy description of the Tepanec War, with a saga largely dedicated to Nezahualcoyotl. The sources used by the author included oral traditions from various informants, as well as pictorial documents in addition to them. He used these sources critically, dismissing those he found unreliable and adding disclaimers when necessary.

In spite of the author's critical usage of his sources, the Annals are still characterised by their "fragmentary character, the disparity of their style, inconsistencies and even contradictions in secondary points." However, some modern researchers, such as Santamarina Novillo (1998), observe such issues with this work as useful to review other historical sources critically, in cases where the sequence of historical events is not clear due to conflicting information they provide.

The three sections of the manuscript were originally written by different authors, but the whole manuscript was written by a single hand, approximately in the early 17th century, which has long been suspected to be that of Fernando de Alva Ixtlilxóchitl himself, despite not demonstrating familiarity with the codex in any of his own works. The original manuscript has unfortunately been lost since 1949, forcing modern historians analysing it to rely on a photographic facsimile published in 1945 by Primo Feliciano Velázquez, and a copy produced by Antonio de León y Gama in the 18th century, currently housed at the Bibliothèque nationale de France (identified at this library as ms. Mexicain 312).

== Early life ==
=== Family and early education ===
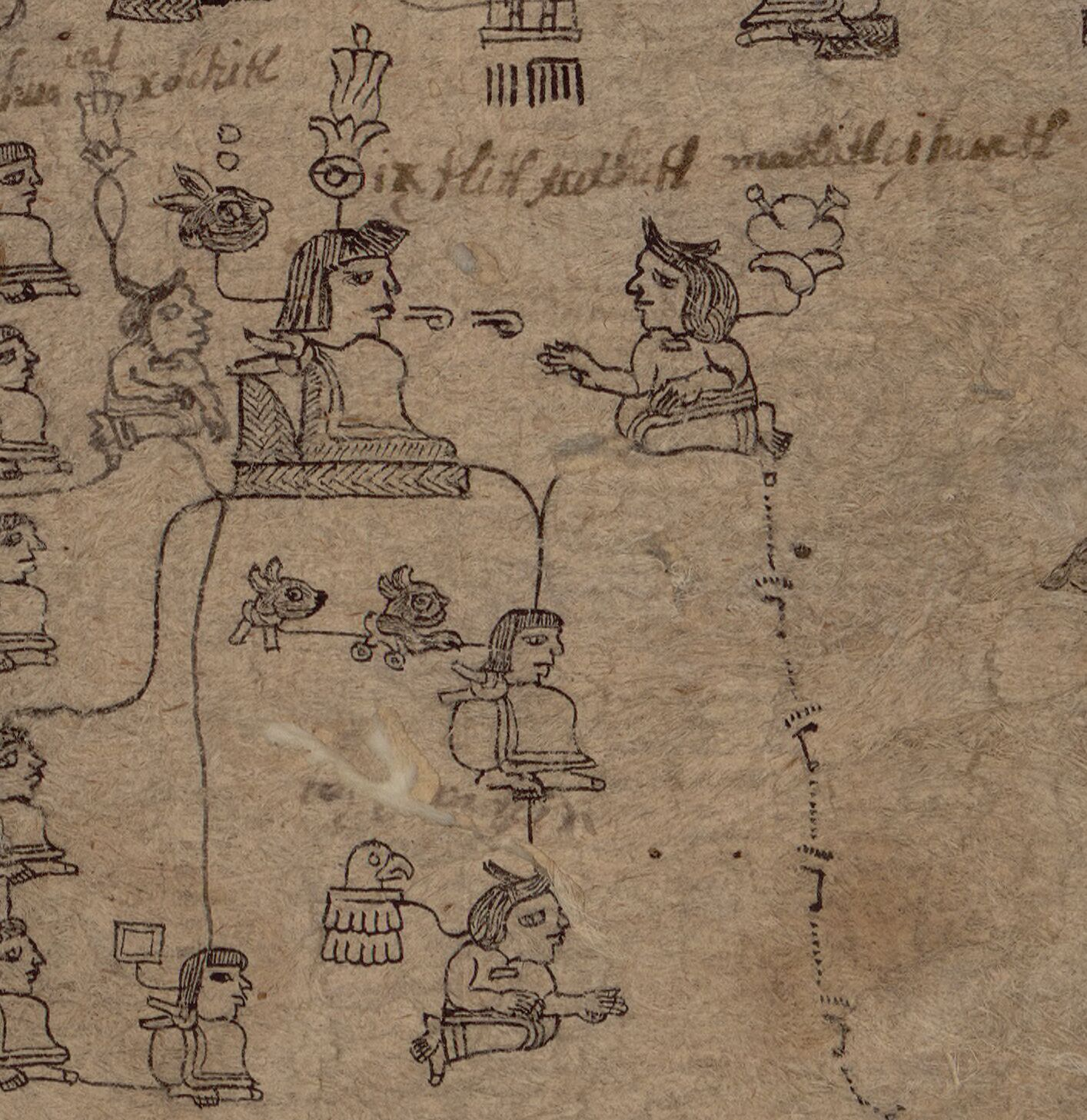
The family of Nezahualcoyotl (seen at the centre), depicted in this detail of the Codex Xolotl (c. 1541). Ixtlilxochitl I sits on a throne (icpalli) at the upper left. His concubine Tecpaxochitl appears sitting behind him.

Born Acolmiztli, on the morning of April 28, 1402, (Note: Aztec calendar date: day 1 Deer (Ce mázatl) of the year 1 Rabbit (Ce tochtli).) he was the son of the king of Texcoco, Ixtlilxochitl Ome Tochtli, better known as Ixtlilxochitl I, who held the title of 6th Chichimec lord, and Matlalcihuatzin, the daughter of Huitzilihuitl and sister of Chimalpopoca, both of whom were tlatoque (kings) of Mexico-Tenochtitlan. According to Fernando de Alva Ixtlilxóchitl, Nezahualcoyotl had a younger legitimate sister named Atotoztzin or Tozquentzin, as well as several siblings who were "illegitimate" due to being born out of concubines. One such concubine was Tecpaxochitl, daughter of Tezozomoc, king of Azcapotzalco and lord of the Tepanecas. Ixtlilxochitl refusing to accept Tecpaxochitl as his wife was considered an act of disrespect toward Tezozomoc, and has been described as one of the disrespectful actions that eventually led to the Tepanec War. Tecpaxochitl became the mother of several children, the first being Zihuaquequenotzin, the second being named Xiconocatzin or Ixhuezcatocatzin, and lastly Tilmatzin.

In spite of being "bastards," some of these children of concubines managed to obtain high positions in Texcoco's society. One such "bastard" was Zihuaquequenotzin, who was described by Alva Ixtlilxóchitl as a "great captain." Soon after being born, Nezahualcoyotl was assigned several tutors to educate him during the early years of his life, including one Huitzilihuitzin, "who at the time was a great philosopher," as Alva Ixtlilxóchitl describes.

=== Ixtlilxochitl's war on the Tepanecas and assassination ===
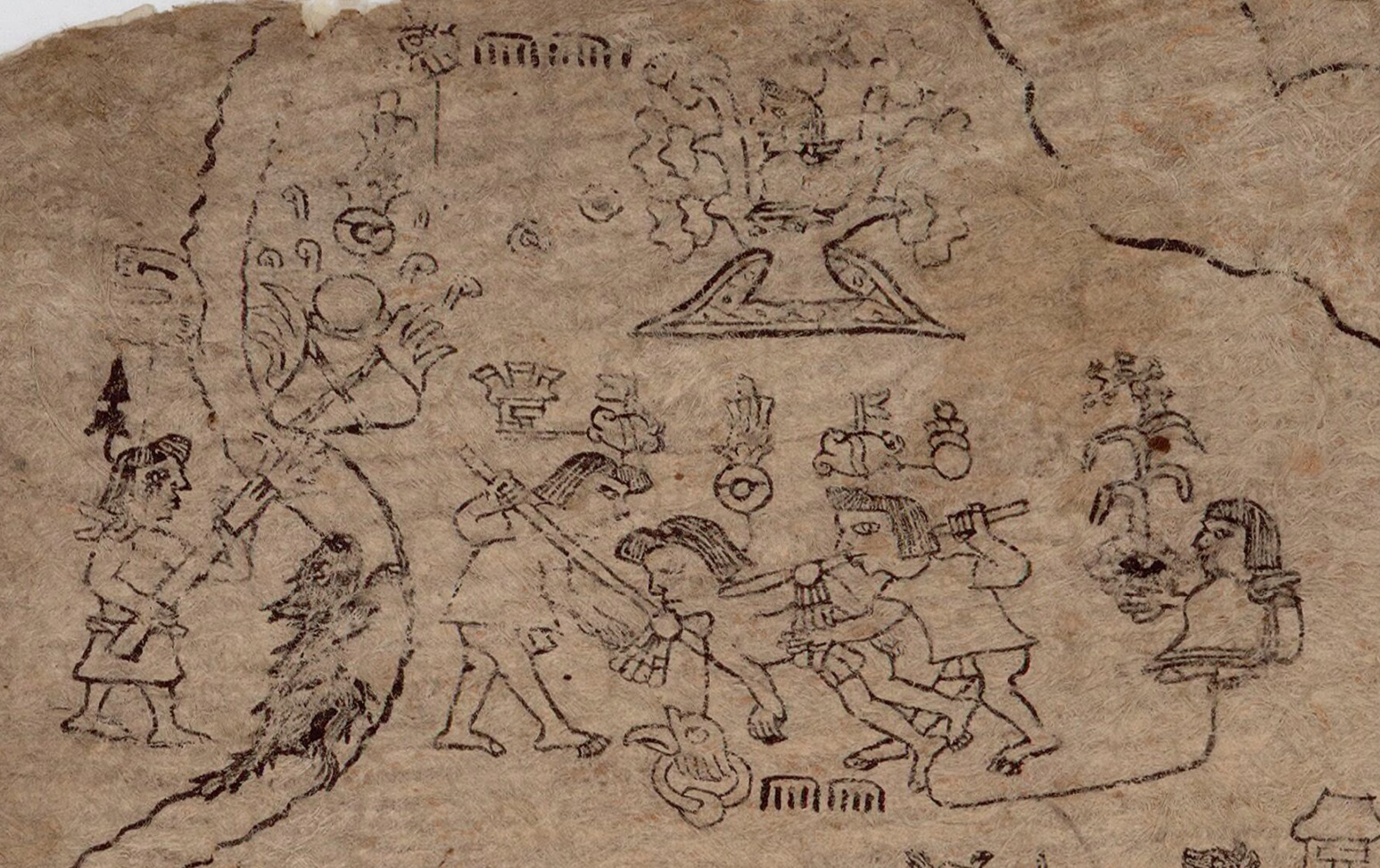
The young Nezahualcoyotl, hiding between the branches of a tree (shown at the top), witnessing his father's assassination, as depicted in Codex Xolotl.

Since the times of Ixtlilxochitl's coronation, there had been an ambient of tension between the Tepanecas of Azcapotzalco and the Acolhua of Texcoco, particularly due to the former people's intention of asserting their dominance over the Valley of Mexico. In spite of the tension, there was no war between Texcoco and Azcapotzalco during much of Ixtlilxochitl's reign, until Azcapotzalco launched a surprise attack on Iztapallocan, approximately on August 6, 1415, (Note: Aztec calendar date, according to Boturini: day 13 Flint of the year 1 Reed, 6th day of the 10th month (Tecuilhuitzintli or Tecuilhuitontli, which was the 6th month in Alva Ixtlilxóchitl's count, and appears as the 7th month in other sources). Alva Ixtlilxóchitl claimed that It was king Ixtlilxochitl himself who planned and started the war a year prior, and that the Tepanec attack on Iztapallocan was in response to an assault launched by the Acolhua.) with the intention of taking over this territory and then attacking the court of Texcoco. The inhabitants of Iztapallocan successfully repelled the violent attack, but the site's provisional ruler was assassinated in an act of treason by a Tepanec sympathiser. Ixtlilxochitl received the news of the attack that same day, and personally marched with an army of 4,000 to come to the aid of the Iztapallocans in case of a second attack. The invading army, however, had retreated back to Azcapotzalco to request reinforcements. Upon being informed of the failure of the attack, the Tepanec king Tezozomoc ordered for the Mexica armies of Tenochtilan and Tlatelolco, among other allies of his, to join the war.

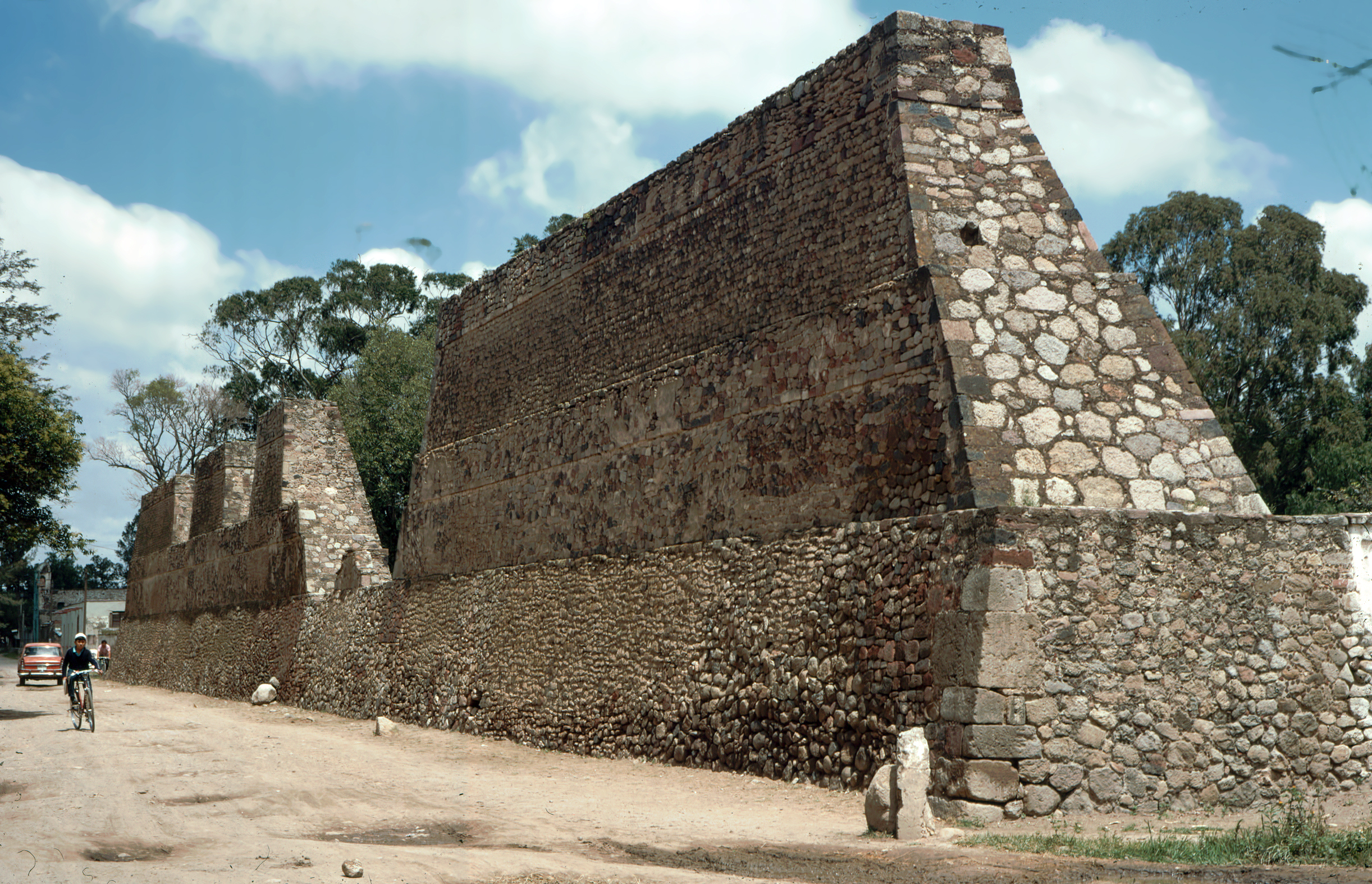
Great walls of Huexotla, the last standing walls of this sort built by the Aztecs, possibly built to mark the city's border. At this city, Nezahualcoyotl became crown prince.

After these events that same year, Ixtlilxochitl organized a meeting with his military commanders the lords of his domains at Huexotla. Following the meeting, the monarch concluded that his son Nezahualcoyotl should be declared as crown prince, when he would have been 13 years old, and that war must be waged against the Tepanecas, laying siege to the city of Mexico via Lake Texcoco, and assaulting Azcapotzalco by land and the lake, with the army marching on land having to march through enemy Tepanec territory. (Note: Alva Ixtlilxóchitl claimed this happened in the year 1414, when Nezahualcoyotl was 12 years old. Aztec calendar date: year 13 Rabbit (Matlactliomey tochtli). According to this author, the planned assault would have occurred before the Tepanec attack on Iztapallocan.)

The lake assault ended in failure rather quickly. Tlacateotl, king of Tlatelolco, intercepted the Acolhua troops before they reached either Mexico or Azcapotzalco, forcing them to retreat back to Texcoco's shore. The war against the Tepanecas lasted four years, during which neither side had a notable advantage. Tezozomoc, observing this situation, took a cruel decision: to assassinate Ixtlilxochitl and his family by pretending to make a truce with Texcoco. The unsuspecting Ixtlilxochitl accepted the truce offer and lifted the siege of Azcapotzalco, ordering his troops to return to their homeland. Approximately on June 25, 1418, (Note: Alva Ixtlilxóchitl's approximation. Aztec calendar date, according to Boturini: day 1 Water of the year 4 Rabbit, 2nd day of the 12th month (Macailhuitl or Micailhuitzintli); Boturini believed this date corresponded to September 12. Alva Ixtlilxóchitl believed instead that this occurred in the 6th month (Tecuilhuitzintli, listed as the 10th month in Boturini's count).) Tezozomoc attempted to convince Ixtlilxochitl to celebrate the newly established peace at the hunting field of Chiconauhtla, where he had set up an army in secrecy to capture Ixtlilxochitl and prince Nezahualcoyotl. Unbeknownst to Tezozomoc, one of Ixtlilxochitl's relatives observed the trap being set up and rapidly returned to Texcoco to alert the king. Subsequently, either by Ixtlilxochitl's order or by his own will, the relative traveled to Chiconauhtla dressed as the king, where he was attacked and seized by a party of men sent by Tezozomoc who discovered his true identity. He was later tortured to death under Tezozomoc's orders.

Ixtlilxochitl sent emissaries to the cities under his domain to gather soldiers to attack the Tepanecas, but to his dismay, he found that the majority of these cities were in open rebellion and had become Tezozomoc's allies. Only the lords of Huexotla, Iztapallocan and Cohuatepec came to his aid. The city of Texcoco was subsequently besieged for several days, after which Ixtlilxochitl took the decision to flee from the city, hiding in the woods along with his servants and several of his sons, including Nezahualcoyotl and Zihuaquequenotzin. Adding to the king's misfortune, approximately on July 10, (Note: Alva Ixtlilxóchitl's approximation. Aztec calendar date, according to Alva Ixtlilxóchitl: day 5 Snake (Macuilicohuatl), 17th day of the month of Tecuilhuitzintli.) Zihuaquequenotzin attempted to travel to Otompan to gather an army to defend his father, not knowing that the city had also abandoned its alliance with Ixtlilxochitl. Subsequently, he was lynched by a local mob in support of Tezozomoc.

On the morning of September 24, 1418, (Note: Aztec calendar date: day 10 Vulture (Matlactli cozcacuauhtli) of the year 4 Rabbit (4 tochtli), 9th day of the 14th month (Huepaniztli, sometimes listed as the 10th or 11th month, alternatively called Ochpanaliztlique or Ochpaniztli). Boturini believed that this date actually corresponded to October 29.) Ixtlilxochitl was informed that Tepanec warriors were approaching his location. The monarch understood what this meant: his death at the hands of these warriors was unavoidable. Upon realizing this, just prior to his death, the monarch ordered for his sons to be taken the woods to go into hiding. Three men took this task, named Huahuantzin, Xiconocatzin and Cuicuitzcatzin. Thus Nezahualcoyotl, along with his older brother Tzontecochatzin, escaped from the tragedy. According to Fernando de Alva Ixtlilxóchitl, a lineal descendant of Nezahualcoyotl, the king addressed his son just before they were separated for the last time. In his last words, Ixtlilxochitl urged his son to not abandon his subjects, nor to forget about his Chichimec heritage, and finally, encouraged him to reclaim his kingdom and avenge him by fighting the Tepanecas. As Nezahualcoyotl remained hidden among the branches of a tree, he was able to see, to his horror, his father being butchered by the Tepanecas using spears, despite his initial resistance. The prince was 16 years old when this occurred.

Tezozomoc replaced Ixtlilxochitl with two lords to rule over Texcoco: a Toltec ruler named Tlotzin and a Chichimec ruler named Chicatzin, also known as Quinatzin.

=== Life in exile ===
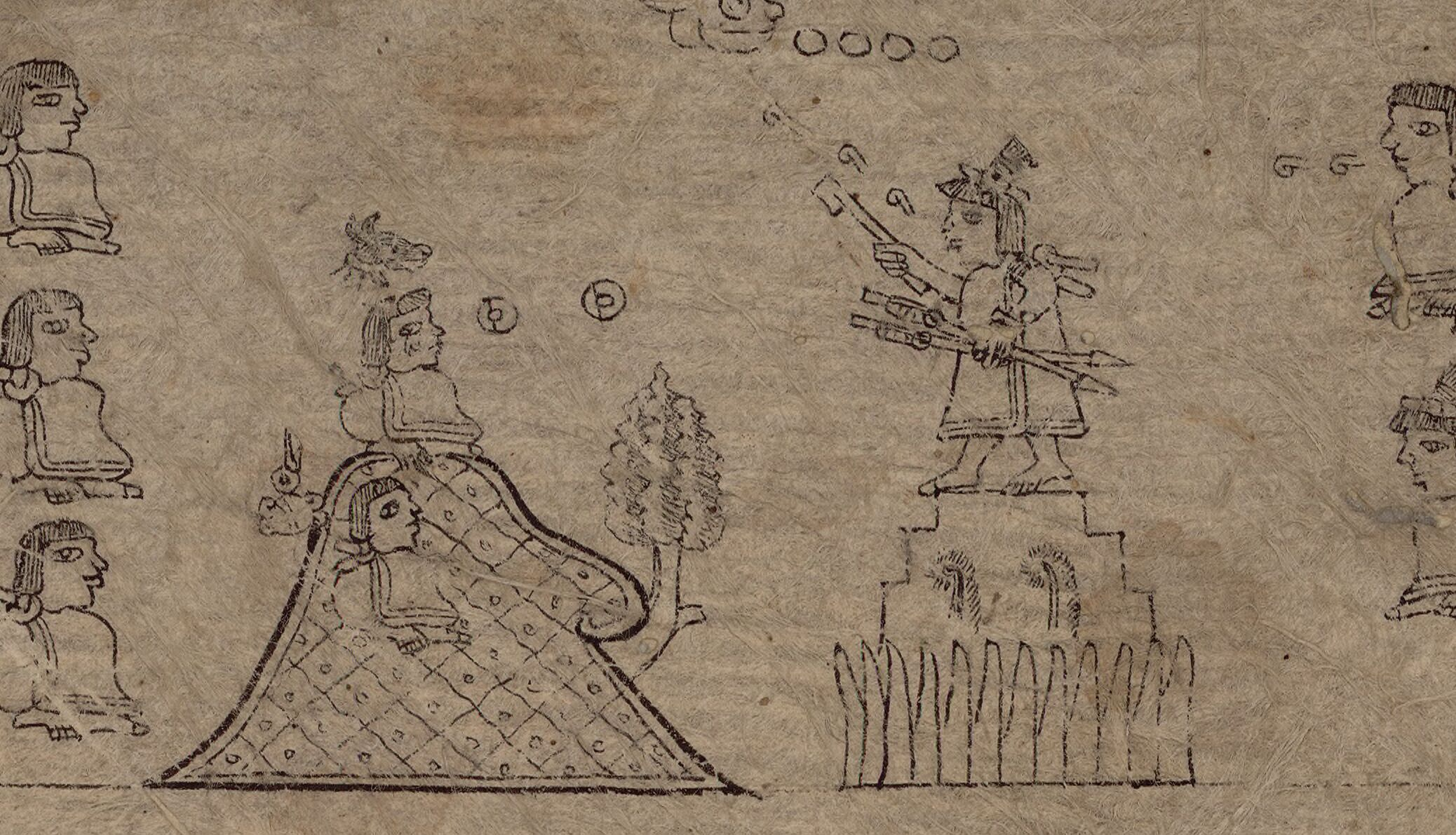
Nezahualcoyotl at the hill of Cuauhyacac (left) observing a Tepanec announcer declaring him wanted dead or alive, shown in Codex Xolotl.

Following his father's assassination, Nezahualcoyotl and his brother spent the following days fleeing, under the care of the three men, while seeking refuge throughout the local crags and gorges to avoid any potential assassins. According to the Annals of Cuauhtitlan, while hiding at Acalhuacan during one night, a companion named Coyohua encountered a boat with men sent by the future tlatoani of Tenochtitlan, Itzcoatl. He had sent a scouting party, composed of his own sons, to find and rescue the orphaned princes, as, through their mother, they were also members of the Mexica royal family, in spite of the war between the Mexica and Ixtlilxochitl. Coyohua informed the party that the princes were still alive, though their father was dead. Then they got onto the boat and sailed for Tenochtitlan.

Adding onto this story, historian Lorenzo Boturini Benaducci describes that Nezahualcoyotl was fleeing with the intention of taking refuge in Tlaxcallan, whose rulers had ties with the kings of Texcoco by sharing a common ancestor (Emperor Tlotzin). Along the way, Nezahualcoyotl managed to encounter some family members, two of his natural brothers and two of his nephews, as well as several loyal subjects who were taking refuge. When he finally arrived at Tlaxcallan, entering via Huejotzingo, accompanied by these family members and the men taking care of him, he was happily received by the local rulers, but he was advised to keep his identity undisclosed and to remain hidden, so that Tezozomoc and his powerful army did not find his location. He remained in Tlaxcallan for several days, but decided to return to his former domains while disguised to gather as much information as possible.

During this time, as part of his actions to assert his dominion, Tezozomoc ordered for all of Ixtlilxochitl's former vassals to congregate at the plains of Cuauhyacac, a site located between Texcoco and Tepetlaoztoc. Once all the lords of Ixtlilxochitl's former domains congregated, one of Tezozomoc's military commanders climbed up to the summit of an ancient Toltec temple, to inform them all that Tezozomoc was their new lord. The commander then added that whoever managed to capture Nezahualcoyotl, dead or alive, and brought him before the king would be rewarded. As Codex Xolotl illustrates, Nezahualcoyotl at the time was hiding on the hill of the site, along with his servant Huitziltetzin, (Note: Boturini believed Huitziltetzin was actually the name of the commander who made the announcement.) where he was able to observe and hear the announcement. Nezahualcoyotl then understood his life was truly in danger, and became more careful thereafter to avoid being identified, while still blending in with the common people to hear any rumors and news about himself.

In 1419, (Note: Aztec calendar date: 5 Reed (Macuilli acatl).) it is recorded that Nezahualcoyotl, disguised and travelling across Chalco to gather information on the site, which was allied with Tezozomoc, killed a woman named Citlamiyauh (or Tziltomiauh) while she was attending her agave plantation, to produce aguamiel. Two versions of this story are told. One story, told by Boturini and Alva Ixtlilxóchitl, claims that Nezahualcoyotl became exhausted and thirsty during the travel, and upon encountering the plantation and the woman attending it, he begged her for her aguamiel. Citlamiyauh immediately recognized Nezahualcoyotl under his disguise, and attempted to alert the locals of his presence. Nezahualcoyotl failed to talk his way out of the situation, and fearing that he would be killed or captured if she continued further, and that he'd be chased if he attempted to flee, he hastily grabbed a macuahuitl and decapitated her. The second story, told by Fray Juan de Torquemada (found dubious by Boturini), claims that the woman gave refuge to Nezahualcoyotl in her own home. The woman, a wealthy plantation owner in this version of the story, was supposedly using her agave to illegally produce and sell large quantities of pulque, an alcoholic beverage. Nezahualcoyotl quickly noticed this, and knowing the laws imposed by his predecessors, he became enraged. He exclaimed that, while he was certainly fleeing from the powerful Tezozomoc, he could not tolerate those who broke the laws established to keep society stable, considering alcohol to be one of the greatest threats to society. Thus, he killed her, and fled from the scene right after, fearing that the ruler of Chalco would put him to death despite his justification.

=== Refuge in Tenochtitlan ===
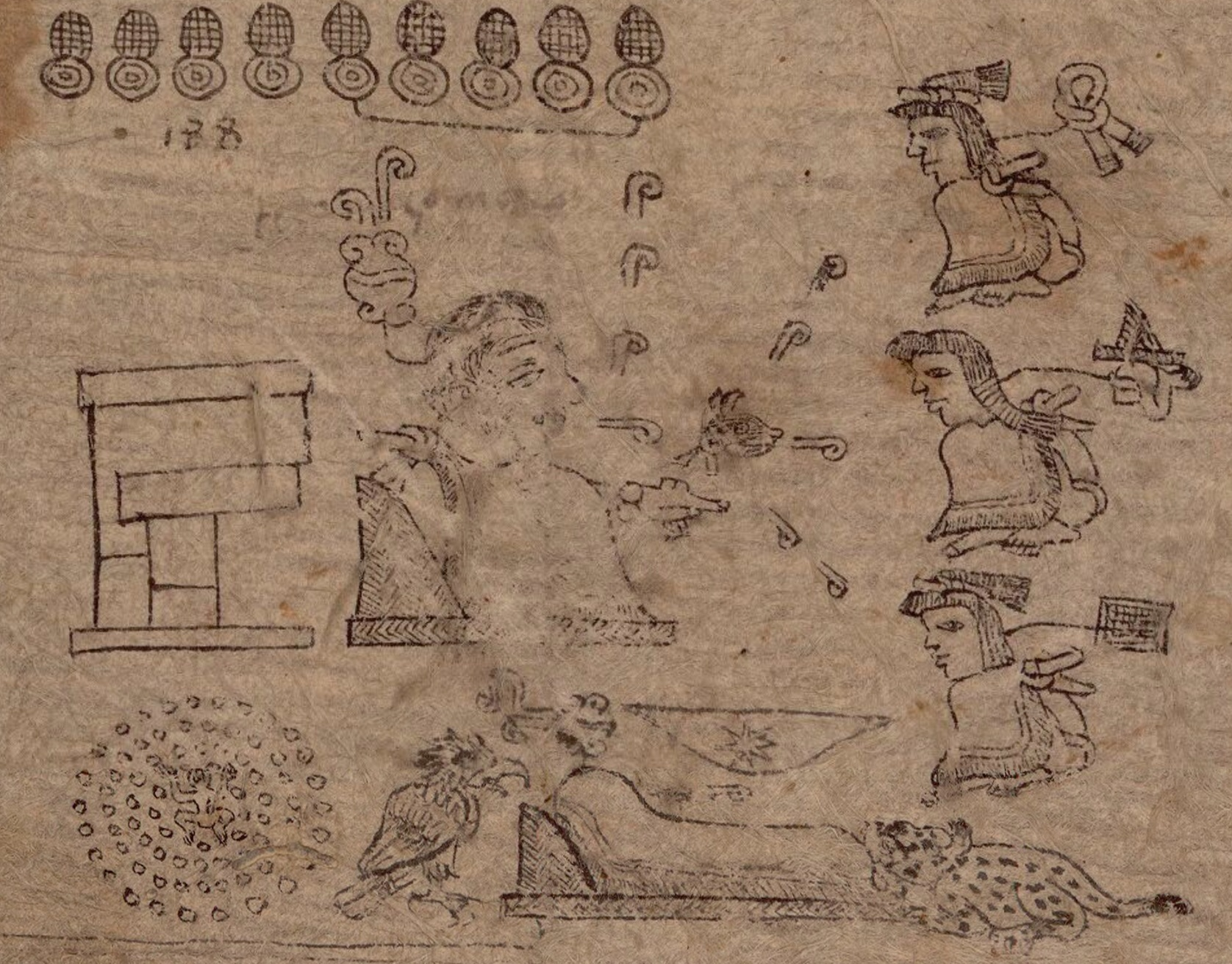
Tezozomoc gathers three of his sons to discuss nightmares he had involving Nezahualcoyotl, concluding that the prince had to be killed. Maxtla, his successor, is seen at the top right. Codex Xolotl.

For the reasons stated earlier, the Mexica nobility and royalty of Tenochtitlan was sympathetic towards Nezahualcoyotl in spite of having contributed to his father's death. According to Alva Ixtlilxóchitl, in 1423, (Note: Aztec calendar date: 8 Rabbit (8 tochtli).) his aunts in Tenochtitlan proved vital for the young prince's survival, coming up with a plan to bring him to Tenochtitlan without putting his life at risk. They would enter the city of Azcapotzalco, accompanied by the female nobility of both cities, with gifts of jewels and precious feathers, to bribe and personally convince Tezozomoc to pardon Nezahualcoyotl. Tezozomoc, who was taken by surprise by this visit, accepted to have a dialogue with these nobles. After offering their gifts, they argued that Nezahualcoyotl, as a crown prince of a great kingdom, did not deserve the treatment he was undergoing; they informed the monarch of the miserable conditions under which the prince lived since his father was killed, being forced to constantly escape from death's grasp, unable to rest no matter where he went, a lifestyle unworthy of a member of royalty. Tezozomoc thus agreed to spare Nezahualcoyotl's life, but under the condition that he would remain at house arrest in the city of Tenochtitlan, strictly under his watch.

Nezahualcoyotl gladly took the opportunity to move to Tenochtitlan as soon as possible. During the years he spent in Tenochtitlan, Nezahualcoyotl most likely received a Mexica-styled education. He was probably educated at the Calmecac, whose students were usually enrolled when they were 15 years old. His exposure to Mexica culture and education would later influence Texcoco's legal system, using Tenochtitlan as a model for his own city. During Nezahualcoyotl's stay in the city, a growing number of supporters for him began to appear, but they kept their support secret to avoid alerting the Azcapotzalco court. As part of the agreement, two years passed in which Nezahualcoyotl did not set foot outside Tenochtitlan, but the diplomatic actions of his aunts gradually contributed to his freedom. Subsequently, he was allowed to exit Tenochtitlan to return to his home city of Texcoco, where he was allowed to stay in the palace of Cilan, which belonged to his parents, the kings of Texcoco.

A legend written in the Annals of Cuauhtitlan, likely from around the time the orphaned princes were in Tenochtitlan, claims that one day, when Nezahualcoyotl fell into the water while he was playing, sorcerers seized him and brought him to the summit of the Poyauhtecatl, the "hill of subtle mists." There, they anoited him ceremoniously with "flood and blaze," that is, with the spirit of war, and told a prophecy: "You shall be the one. We ordain your fate, and by your hand a nation [Azcapotzalco] shall be destroyed." Then, he was brought back to the very spot he was taken from.

Another legend, attributed to a colonial-era indigenous noble named Don Alonso Axayacatzin, lord of Iztapalapa and son of Emperor Cuitlahuac of Tenochtitlan, tells a story of Tezozomoc having two nightmares about Nezahualcoyotl in late 1426 or early 1427. In the first nightmare, Nezahualcoyotl transformed into a golden eagle, which devoured his entrails and his heart. In the second nightmare, he transformed into a jaguar, which butchered his feet. Horrified by these nightmares, Tezozomoc consulted his priests to understand their meaning. Subsequently, Tezozomoc gathered three of his sons—Maxtla, Tayauh and Atlatocaycpaltzin—and explained to them that his death was rapidly approaching due to his extraordinary age, and then added that in order to rule the land without interference, they had to kill Nezahualcoyotl, quickly and without difficulty, because if they let him live, he would rule the whole land and destroy their empire.

According to the Annals, after this incident, Tezozomoc repeatedly sent a servant named Coyohua (lit. "Coyote Owner," apparently a play on words due to the meaning of Nezahualcoyotl's name) to secretly assassinate Nezahualcoyotl, in ways that appeared accidental. Tezozomoc knew that Coyohua was a close friend and mentor of Nezahualcoyotl, but what the Tepanec ruler did not count on was that Coyohua would rather help his friend survive than to obey his orders. Thus, at every instance, Coyohua told Nezahualcoyotl about Tezozomoc's plans to assassinate him, saving his life. Whenever Coyohua was called upon to explain why Nezahualcoyotl had not been killed, he would justify himself and blame external and unpredicted factors. Coyohua received instructions to pierce Nezahualcoyotl's neck with a dart, throw him off a bridge or rooftop, and other plots, yet he deliberately disobeyed on every occasion.

== The reconquest of Texcoco ==
=== Prelude: Maxtla's reign ===
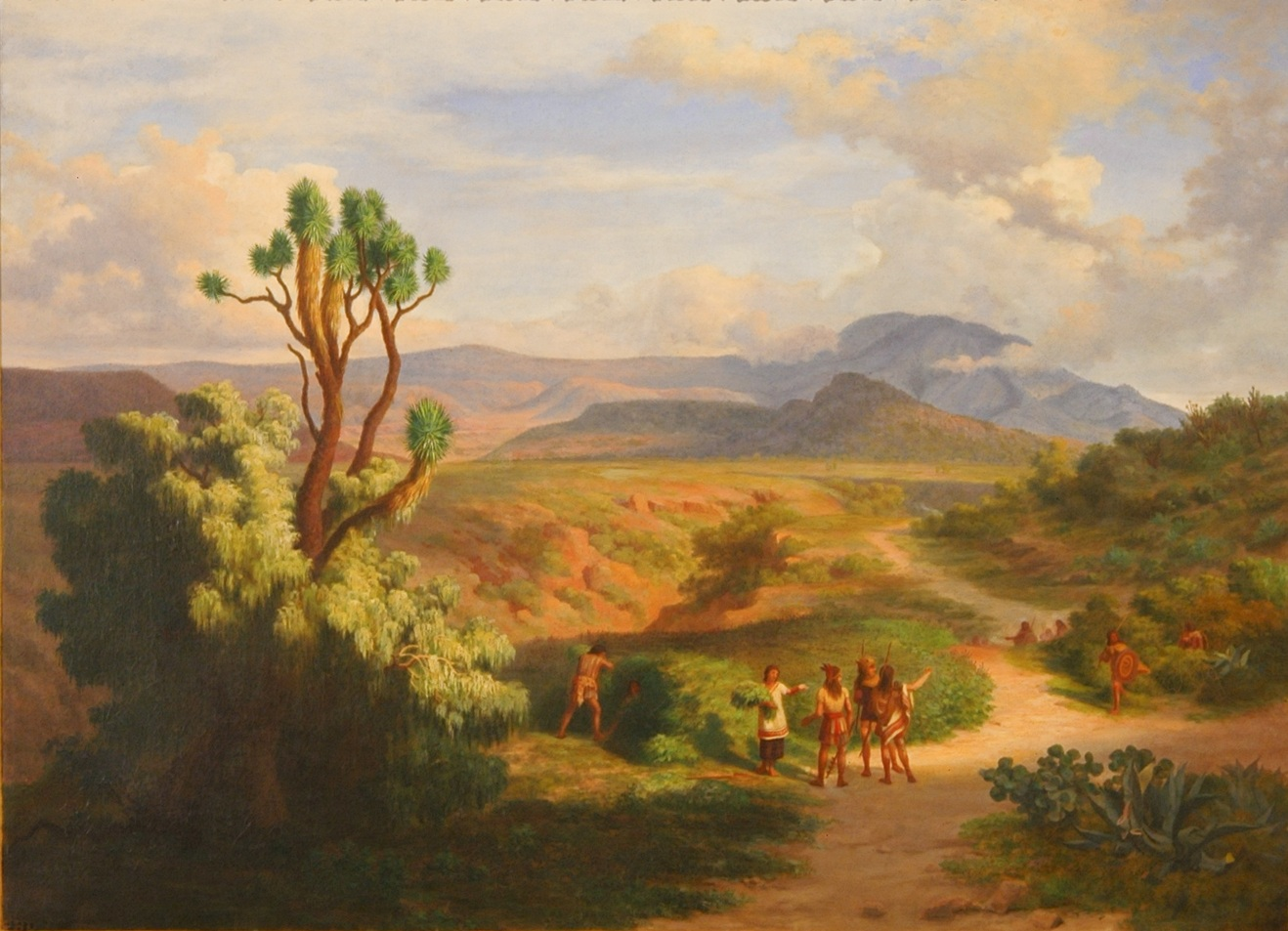
Nezahualcoyotl hides from Maxtla's assassins at a chia field. Historical landscape painting by Luis Coto, 1865. The hill in the background has been identified as Texcotzingo as seen from the north, but according to the historical record, this event took place at the south.

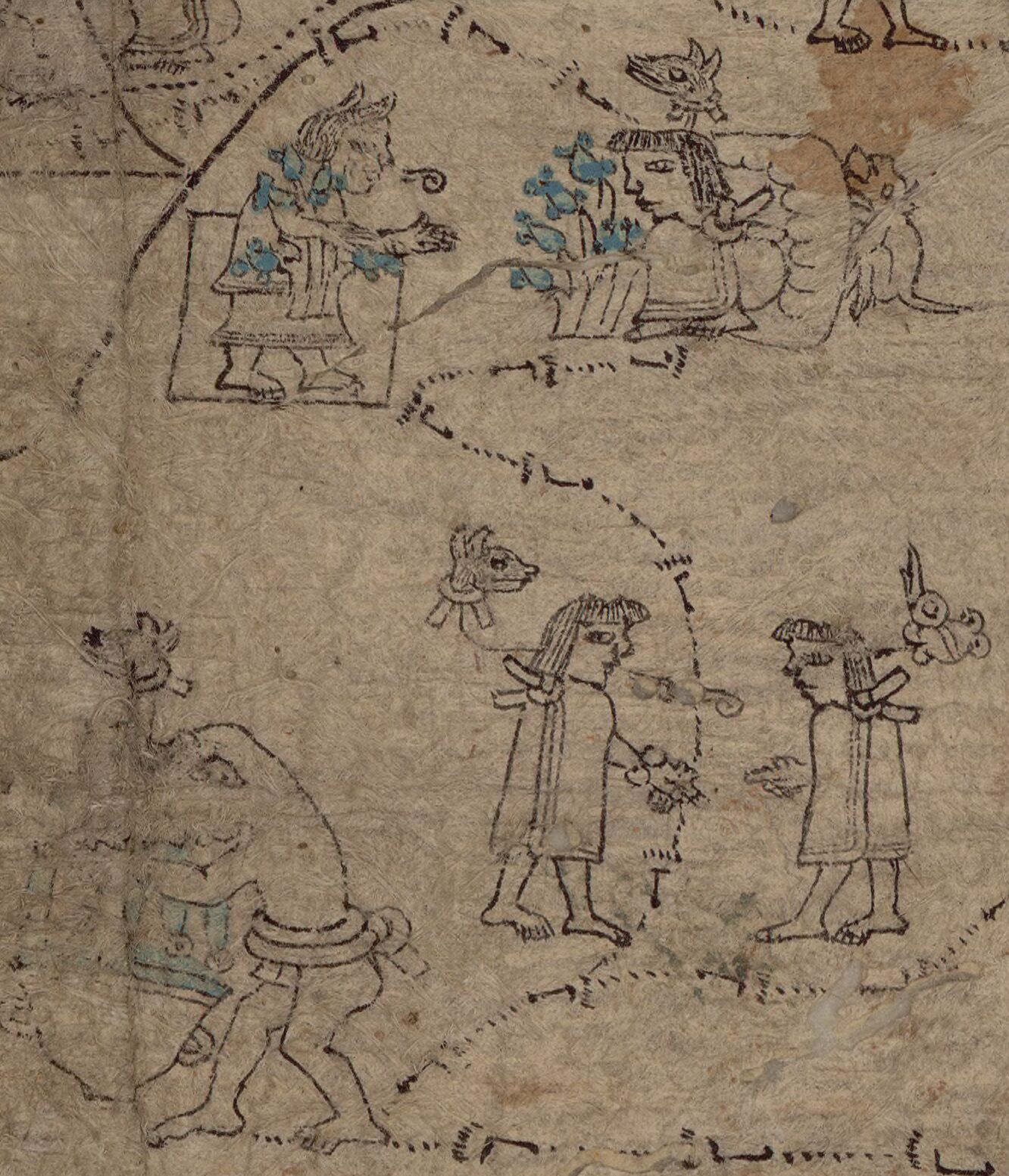
Depiction of Nezahualcoyotl hiding among chia plants in the Codex Xolotl (c. 1541) as an elderly woman attending the field speaks to him (at the top of the picture).

Under Maxtla's reign, Nezahualcoyotl became forced to move into exile and evade assassination attempts from the Tepanecs once again.

In 1427, Tezozomoc, king of Azcapotzalco and lord of the Tepanecs, died after an extraordinarily lengthy rule (the Codex Xolotl makes the rather improbable claim that he ruled for 180 or 188 years, and the Annals of Cuauhtitlan similarly claim he ruled for 131 years). Fernando de Alva Ixtlilxóchitl recorded the date of his passing as the morning of March 24, 1427. (Note: Aztec calendar date: day 1 Vulture (Ce cozcacuauhtli) of the year 13 Reed (Matlactliomei acatl), fourth day of the year, during the first month (Tlacaxipehualiztli). The Codex Xolotl registers the day as 1 Rabbit (Ce tochtli).) Before his passing, he had selected his sons to rule different altepeme (city-states) after his death, declaring that his son Tayauh, also known as Quetzalayatzin, would become his successor as king of Azcapotzalco, while Maxtla, his older brother, would keep his position as ruler of Coyohuacan. Tezozomoc's funerary ceremonies lasted three days; Nezahualcoyotl and his brother Tzontecochatzin were present during his cremation ceremony, along with Maxtla, Tayauh and the Mexica kings of Tenochtitlan and Tlatelolco, Chimalpopoca and Tlacateotl.

Maxtla, who appears in the historical record as tyrannical and short-tempered, could not tolerate not being chosen as his father's successor in the throne despite being older than his brother Tayauh, as it was tradition that the eldest sons should inherit the throne. By means of force, he took the throne of Azcapotzalco away from his younger brother, defying his father's will. According to both the Annals of Cuauhtitlan and the Codex Xolotl, Chimalpopoca, king of Tenochtitlan, attempted to form a conspiracy with Tayauh to kill Maxtla and restore Azcapotzalco's rightful ruler. Maxtla's spies heard about the conspiracy, and subsequently, Maxtla killed his brother and imprisoned Chimalpopoca, throwing him into a jailhouse (cuauhcalli). The story of Chimalpopoca's death differs significantly between the available sources, as the ruling classes of Tenochtitlan formed an "official history" which benefitted their interests, and which is present in the majority of surviving sources; this article will address the Acolhua (Texcocan) perspective, as told in works such as the Codex Xolotl and those of Fernando de Alva Ixtlilxóchitl (which are no less partisan than the "official history"), and modern historical analysis on the subject.

==== Chimalpopoca's death and the Tenochtitlan uprising ====
The "official history" of Chimalpopoca's death formed by the ruling elite of Tenochtitlan has remained a popular narrative throughout the centuries in spite of its "suspicious" nature. This official history, present in Tenochca and Acolhua sources, insists that Chimalpopoca was killed under Maxtla's orders, though the circumstancces vary between the Tenochca and Acolhua narratives.

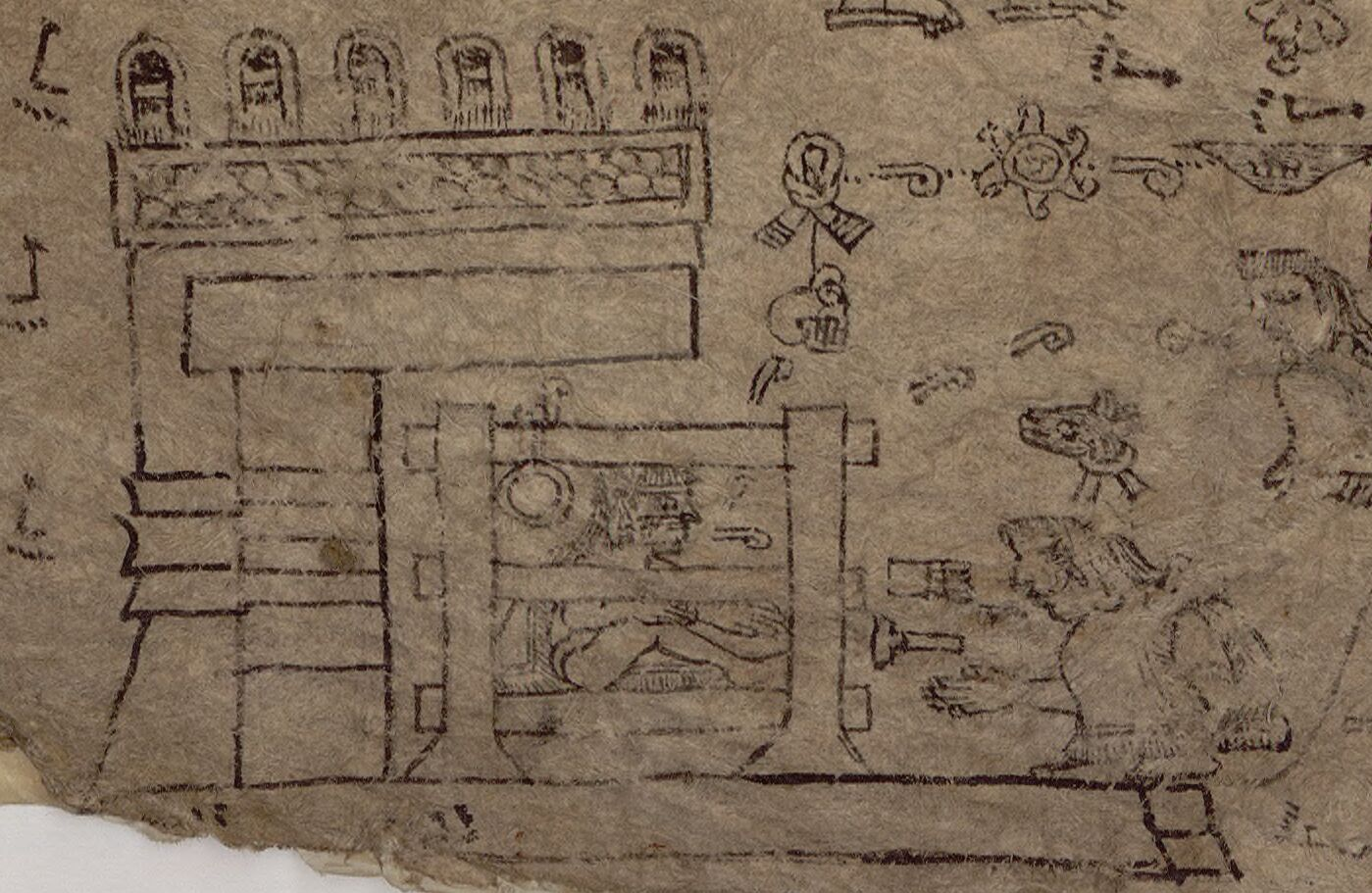
Nezahualcoyotl visits Chimalpopoca while he's in prison. Codex Xolotl, c. 1541.

According to the iconography of the Codex Xolotl, Maxtla justified the killing of his brother citing "the laws of my great-grandfather Xolotl and his ancestors." Subsequently, Nezahualcoyotl and his brother Tzontecochatzin chose to go to Azcapotzalco to visit Chimalpopoca, who was in prison, putting his own life at risk. After obtaining Maxtla's permission to pay a visit (despite the fact that Maxtla was planning to kill him), Nezahualcoyotl and Chimalpopoca managed to meet each other while the latter was inside his wooden cage. After Nezahualcoyotl offered food to Chimalpopoca, gathered from a sown field nearby, the two had a conversation in which the imprisoned king told Nezahualcoyotl about Maxtla's intention to kill Tlacateotl, the ruler of Tlatelolco, so that the Mexica and Acolhua no longer had any kings, forcing them into submission.

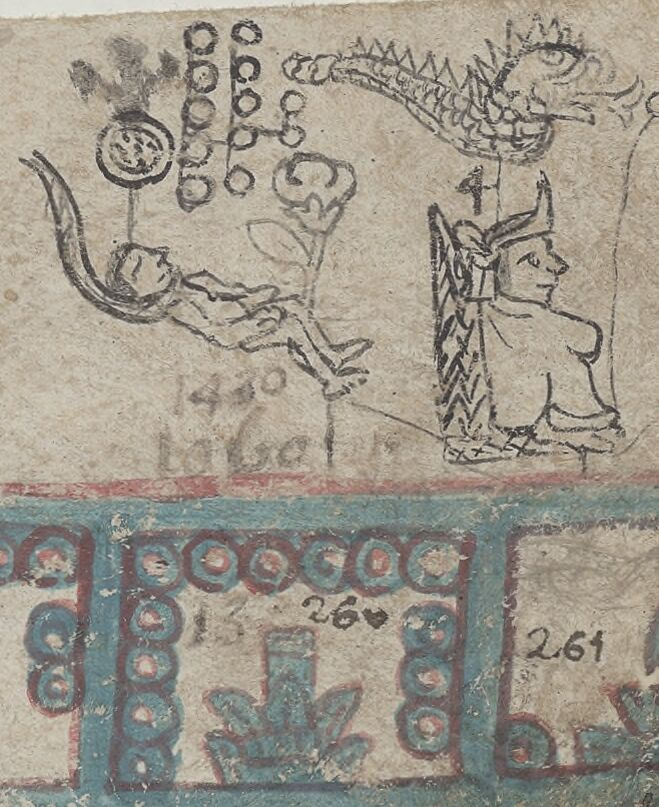
Chimalpopoca's death and the enthronement of Itzcoatl, illustrated in the Codex Mexicanus, c. 17th century. Chimalpopoca appears with a rope tied around his neck, indicating death by suicide or strangulation. He also appears with a flower coming off his body, apparently indicating that he died as a sacrifice (the Nahuatl verb xochimictia, lit. "flower-kill," refers to human sacrifice).

Chimalpopoca died after these events. The circumstances of his death remain unclear due to the contradictions present in the sources. In the "official version," Maxtla sent assassins to Chimalpopoca's palace, killing him. (Note: Diego Durán described that Chimalpopoca was assassinated by the Tepanecs under Maxtla and died young, as he was enthroned when he was a child, and that the Tepanecs also killed his "infant" son Tehuetlehuac (or Teuctlehuac). This is vehemently denied by other historians, such as Fray Juan de Torquemada, who referred to this narrative as a "great fable" (grande fábula) and a "humbug" (patraña). Torquemada claims that Chimalpopoca was over 40 years old when he took the throne, and that he probably had one or more wives by then, although the historical record does not confirm this. Additionally, this author also claims that he was not assassinated, but that he killed himself while in prison. Modern researchers believe that Chimalpopoca being described as a "child" meant that the Mexica considered him weak, which, according to Santamarina Novillo (1998), supports the theory that he was killed in a coup. Furthermore, Teuctlehuac in other sources is described not as an infant prince, but as a tlacochcalcatl (commanding general of the military), who likewise committed suicide.) An alternative explanation, although found in the minority of sources, describes that Chimalpopoca committed suicide by hanging himself. Santamarina Novillo (1998) proposed a theory he called the "coup thesis" (tesis golpista) in which he suggests, based on a handful of sources and the complicated political situation of the time, that Chimalpopoca was killed in a coup d'état orchestrated by Itzcoatl, Moctezuma I and the ruler of the Tepanec city of Tlacopan, Acolnahuacatl. In any case, Maxtla was accused of killing Chimalpopoca, as well as Tlatelolco's ruler Tlacateotl. Once Itzcoatl became the king of Tenochtitlan, the deaths of these rulers became the casus belli that justified launching a revolution against the Tepanecs. Although the Mexica were vassals of the Tepanecs, there was an increasing sentiment of independence among the Mexica, which became more notable as Tenochtitlan gained more political and military power. If Maxtla did order Chimalpopoca's assassination, it may have been in response to the increasing power that the Mexica were gathering through their military exploits, perceiving it as a threat to his nation.

=== The reconquest ===
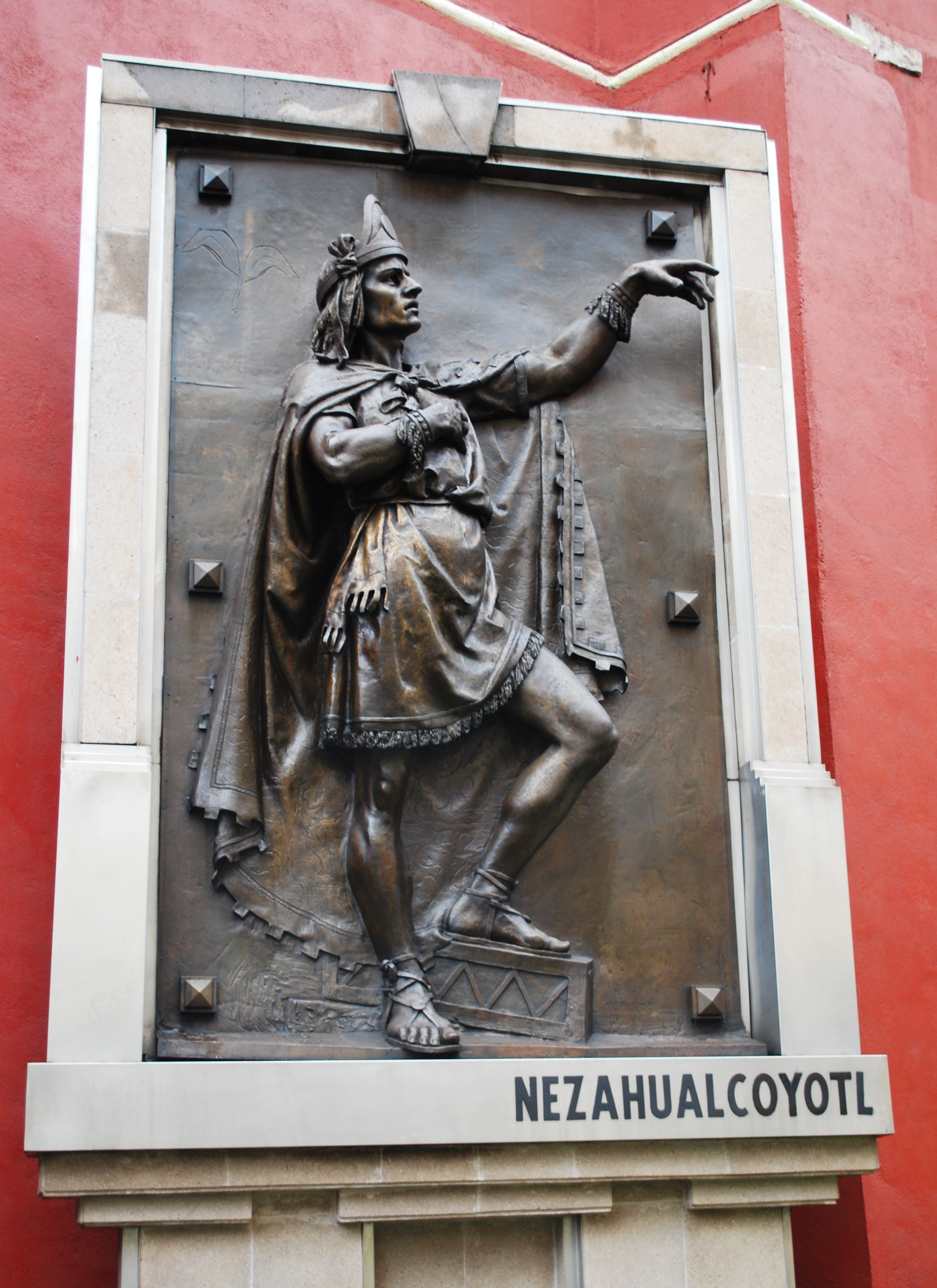
Bronze casting done of Nezahualcoyotl by Jesús Fructuoso Contreras in the Garden of the Triple Alliance located in the historic center of Mexico City.

As the tlatoani Itzcoatl of Tenochtitlan requested help from the Huexotzincans against the Tepanecs, Nezahualcoyotl envisioned a single military force in order to fight the mighty kingdom of Azcapotzalco. After being offered support from insurgents inside Acolhuacan and rebel Tepanecs from Coyohuacan, Nezahualcoyotl joined the war. He called for a coalition consisting of many of the most important pre-Hispanic cities of the time: Tenochtitlan, Tlacopan, Tlatelolco, Huexotzinco, Tlaxcala and Chalco.

The war was declared a shared and single effort, and the coalition army of more than 100,000 men under the command of Nezahualcoyotl and other important tlatoque headed towards Azcapotzalco from the city of Calpulalpan. This began the military offensive that would reconquer Acolhuacan in 1428.

The campaign was divided into three parts. One army attacked Acolman to the north and the second Coatlinchan to the south. A contingent led by Nezahualcoyotl himself was intended to attack Acolhuacan, only after providing support, upon request, to the first two armies. The coalition conquered Acolman and Otumba, sacking them only due to the sudden Tepanec siege of Tenochtitlan and Tlatelolco.

In a tactical move, the three armies united again and then divided into two. One of them, under Nezahualcoyotl, headed towards Texcoco, laying siege to Acolhuacan on its way, while the other attacked and destroyed Azcapotzalco. At the time the armies met again, Nezahualcoyotl reclaimed Texcoco and decided to conquer Acolhuacan, entering from the north while the Tenochca and Tlacopan allies coming from Azcapotzalco attacked from the south. The two armies simultaneously attacked Acolhuacan from two directions until they controlled the city's main square.

After their victory, the coalition began a series of attacks on isolated Tepanec posts throughout the territory of Texcoco. The defeat of the Tepanecs and the total destruction of the kingdom of Azcapotzalco gave rise to the Aztec Triple Alliance between Texcoco, Tenochtitlan, and Tlacopan. Nezahualcoyotl was eventually crowned Tlatoani of Texcoco in 1431.

A decade later, eager to produce a noble heir, Nezahualcoyotl married Azcalxochitzin after the death of her first husband, King Cuahcuauhtzin of Tepechpan.

== Reign and consolidation of the Aztec Empire ==
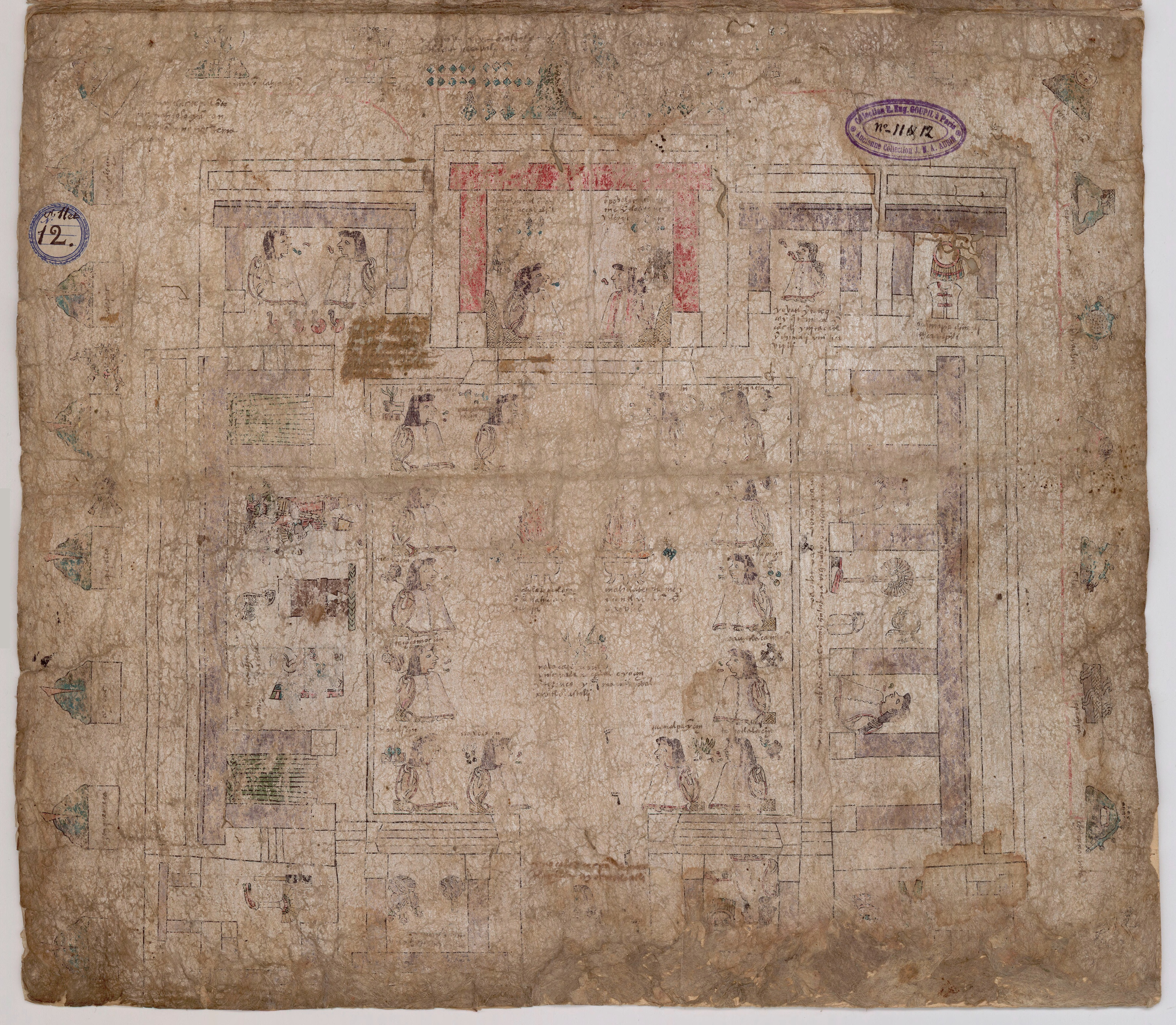
Leaf 2 of the Mapa Quinatzin, depicting the palace of Nezahualcoyotl, who appears sitting along with his son Nezahualpilli at the upper part of the illustration. The lords subordinate to Texcoco appear in the courtyard at the centre, including Tencoyotzin of Tepechpan, Tlazolyaotzin of Huexotla, Cocopin of Tepetlaoztoc, Cuauhtlatzacuilotzin of Chiauhtla, and more.

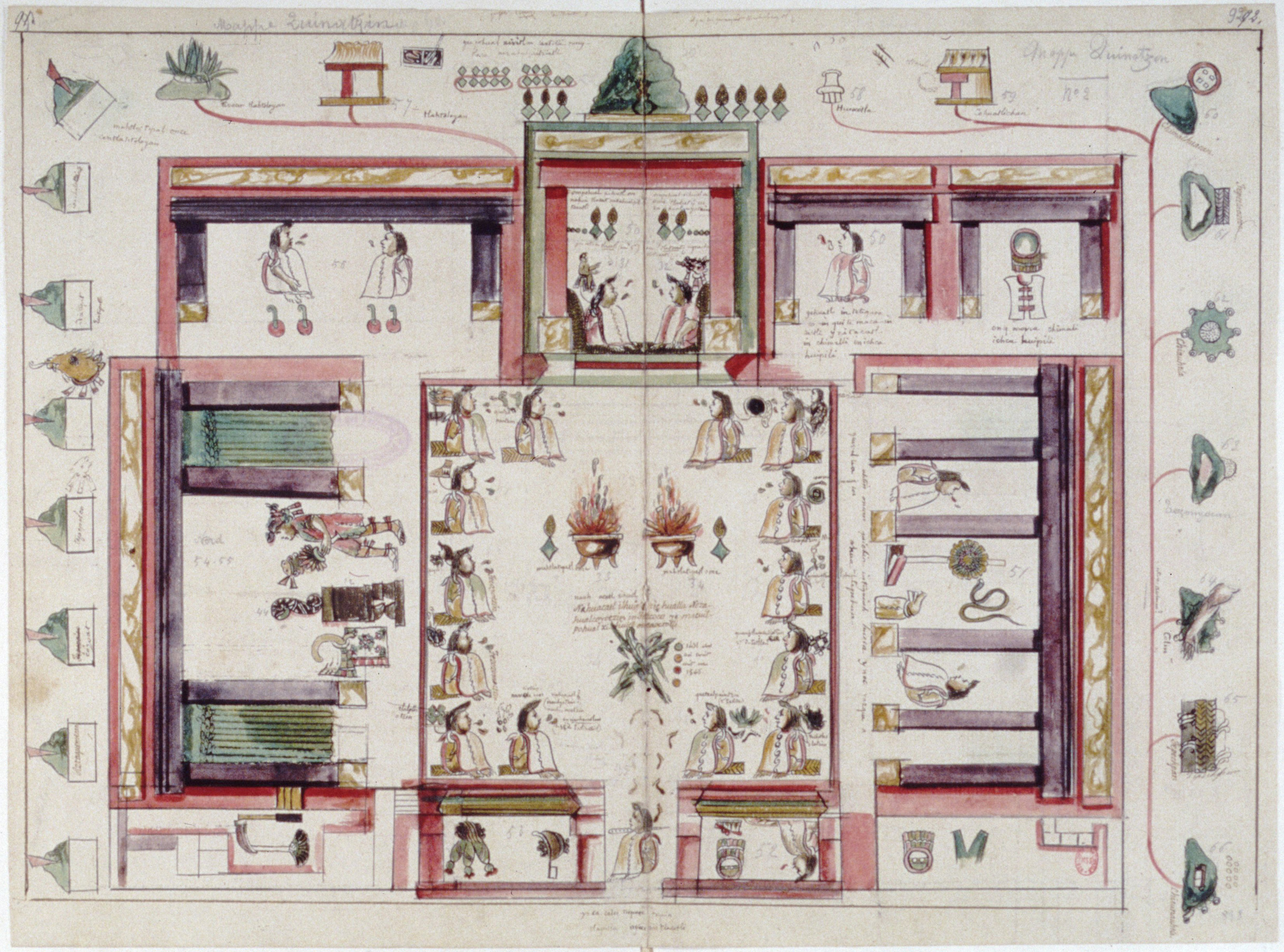
Copy of the second leaf of the Mapa Quinatzin produced by José Antonio Pichardo (1748-1812). The illustration is simplified. According to first-hand accounts, the number of braziers in the palace courtyard (originally painted white, Pichardo changed their colour in this copy), was possibly as high as 150, not two as shown here.

Nezahualcoyotl was enthroned as king of Texcoco, and therefore lord of Acolhuacan, in 1431, with the blessing of the king of Mexico-Tenochtitlan, Itzcoatl. One of his first actions as king of Texcoco was to reinstate the rightful rulers of the region of Acolhuacan. Under Tepanec rule, the cities of Acolhuacan had been under the domain of the sons and relatives of the Tepanec emperor Tezozomoc, many of whom died during the Tepanec War.

Some of the cities came to be under the rule of Nezahualcoyotl's own family, such as the city of Chiauhtla, whose first ruler was Cuauhtlatzacuilotzin, a natural son of the king, who was installed as ruler as a child. Cuauhtlatzacuilotzin would later be described as one of Nezahualcoyotl's most prominent biographers, documenting his father's deeds in his now-lost annals, according to historian (and descendant of Nezahualcoyotl) Fernando de Alva Ixtlilxóchitl. Diel (2014), however, finds that Cuauhtlatzacuilotzin was probably born in 1450 (10 Rabbit), two decades after the defeat of Azcapotzalco. Therefore, Diel suspects that Nezahualcoyotl may have changed the way he controlled his subordinates later in his reign; rather than to keep the local tlatoque (kings) and secure their loyalty through marriage, as he had done early in his reign, he took the choice of installing his own family as tlatoque in order to have more direct control over his subordinate territories. Another family member, Quetzalmamalitzin, his son-in-law, was installed as ruler of Teotihuacan, although this city had been previously ruled by his deceased father Huetzin. Quetzalmamalitzin would also be the head of the tribunal hearing the cases and litigations of the nobility and lords.

He proceeded to reorganize Acolhuacan in order to adminiser the province more effectively. The province was divided into eight regions, each with a selected calpixqui (lit. "guardian of the house," tribute collector; they usually belonged to the commoner class, known as macehualtin) to oversee the labour of the commoners and ensure the payment of tribute. The regions were: Texcoco, Atenco, Tepepolco, Axapochco, Quauhtlatzinco, Tetitlan and Tecpilpan. Each of these possessed certain number of towns and villages, usually around a dozen (Quauhtlatzinco was probably the largest, with 27 towns and villages). According to Charles Gibson—cited by Hicks (1978)—the farthest region from the capital was Tecpilpan, whose eight subjects were located in the region of modern-day Zempoala, Hidalgo, at the north east of Acolhuacan. The largest tribute to be paid was by the regions of Texcoco and Atenco (whose calpixque were named Matlalaca and Tochtli respectively); both regions had to pay everyday for a period of 70 days up to 400,000 corn tortillas, 32,000 (4 xiquipilli of) cacao pods, 100 turkeys, 31 fanegas and 3 almuds (3 tlacopintlis) of corn grain, and more to sustain the palace (tecpan) with food. Biographer José Luis Martínez Rodríguez finds that "these supplies reached numbers that today appear excessive to us if not imaginary," although he clarifies that the food was destined to the lords of the court, the members of the councils and tribunals and the servants, all of whom lived in the palace, along with their families.

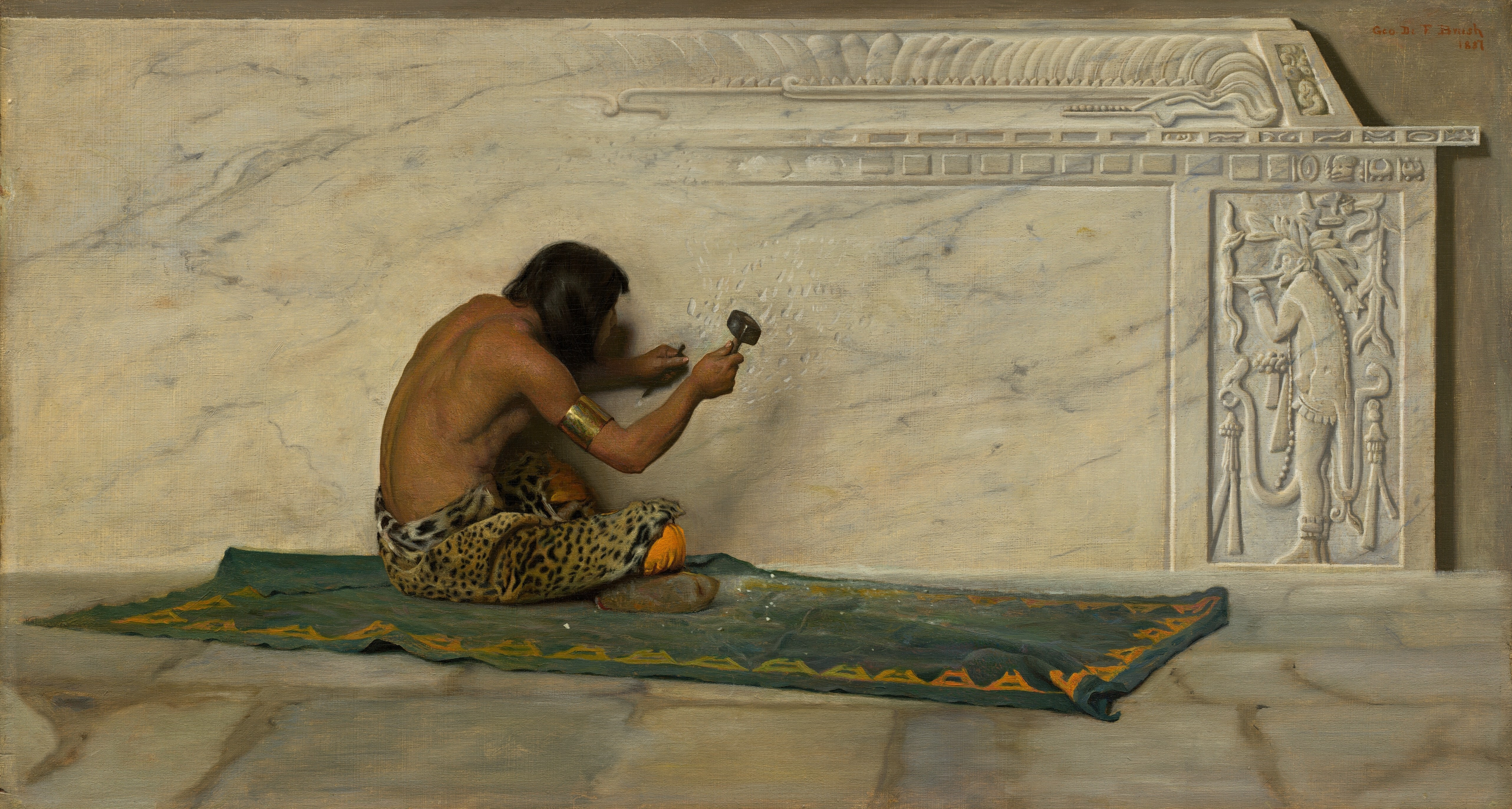
An Aztec Sculptor, by George de Forest Brush, 1887.

Tribute was paid in the form of tangible goods, such as food and resources, or in the form of services, such as cleaning and maintaining the palaces and making preparations for important occasions. He gathered a large number of artists and artisans from various regions of Acolhuacan and abroad, ordering them to be settled at the city of Texcoco. Nezahualcoyotl's government placed these artistans into over 30 different categories, and the artisans belonging to each category was assigned to live in a respective "barrio," so that there were especialized "barrios" inhabited by artistans of a certain category. A similar system appears to have existed in Tenochtitlan, judging from Bernardino de Sahagún's description of especialized barrios inhabited by featherworkers and merchants.

== Conquests ==
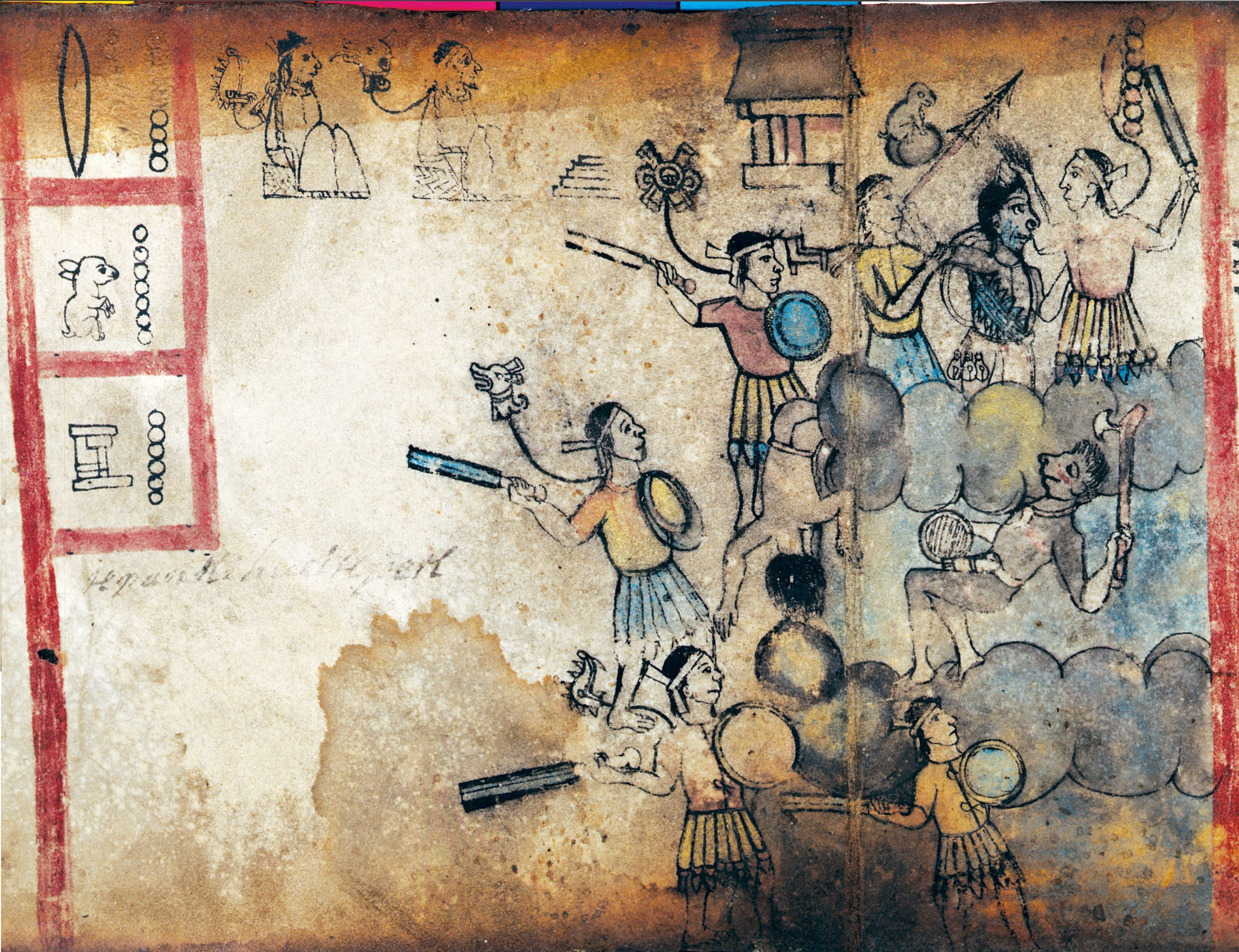
Apparent depiction of Nezahualcoyotl (centre) and his son Cipactli beneath him attacking a Huastec fortress, illustrated in the Códice de Xicotepec.

After his ascension to the Acolhua throne, Nezahualcoyotl participated in multiple military campaigns along with the other members of the Triple Alliance, specifically with Itzcoatl, Moctezuma I and Axayacatl, tlatoque (kings) of Mexico-Tenochtitlan, and Totoquihuaztli I, king of Tlacopan. He's credited with the conquests of the cities of Coatepec, Acolman, Teotihuacan and Zempoala (in the modern-day state of Hidalgo), which he conquered along with Moctezuma. The Relaciones geográficas of Zempoala and Epazoyucan, from 1580, claim that both cities were under Acolhua domain until Nezahualcoyotl's reign, when he transferred the domain of Zempoala to Itzcoatl, along with half of the tribute paid to the Acolhua by Epazoyucan.

Nezahualcoyotl's conquests are depicted in some pictorial documents along with Mexica conquests. One such document is the Codex Azcatitlan, which depicts his conquest of Tulancingo, in modern-day Hidalgo, which took place in 1450, according to Chimalpahin. Nezahualcoyotl's presence in the contents of Codex Azcatitlan, a Mexica document, demonstrates his closeness to the Mexica, as the tlacuilo (painter-scribe) of each region usually focused exclusively on the history of their own city or nation when they wrote their histories. Nezahualcoyotl's presence in the document, thus, demonstrates that the scribe of Codex Azcatitlan considers his military deeds as part of Mexica history. Other conquests are shown in other codices, such as the Codex en Cruz, which depicts Nezahualcoyotl appointing Cocopin as the ruler of Tepetlaoztoc in 1431.

The most detailed and iconic illustration of the Códice de Xicotepec, an Acolhua document dating to the 1560s or 1570s, depicts an army of Acolhua warriors, identified by their unique battle attire, attacking a natural Huastec fortress built atop a hill in the year 1444, (Note: Aztec calendar date: year 4 Flint (4 tecpatl).) capturing and killing the defeated defenders. Multiple researchers have identified the central figure of the illustration as Nezahualcoyotl, fighting along with his son Cipactli. Stresser-Péan (1995) interprets the scene as Nezahualcoyotl's conquest (or reconquest) of Tuxpan and Xiuhcoac, two great provinces of the Huastec region, as described by Fernando de Alva Ixtlilxóchitl. The scene would imply the campaign was executed exclusively by Nezahualcoyotl using his Acolhua forces, as Moctezuma did not show interest in the Huastec region until the 1450s. However, according to an alternative interpretation proposed by Offner (2010), due to discrepancies in the name glyphs identifying the warriors, the depicted figure is not Nezahualcoyotl, but rather a sovereign named "Xolotl." Additionally, Offner finds that the toponym of the conquered site is Tuzapan. In this interpretation, "Xolotl" would appear as a founder of Xicotepec sometime between 1438 and 1443, (Note: Aztec calendar date: years 11 Rabbit (11 tochtli) and 3 Reed (3 acatl).) as shown in another illustration of the manuscript. Stresser-Péan's earlier analysis of this other illustration led him to conclude that Nezahualcoyotl and Cipactli had arrived at Xicotepec between 1438 and 1443, perhaps in response to conflicts in the region, and that they returned in 1444 to wage war on the Huastecs. Stresser-Péan further adds that Nezahualcoyotl may have eventually imposed Cipactli as ruler of Xicotepec, reigning from 1451 to 1478.

Nezahualcoyotl's participation in the conquest of Chalco, which occurred in 1454 according to the Codex en Cruz, is mentioned several times in a lengthy poem from that region, simply entitled Yaocuicatl, which means War song:

Ca ye no yan cuicani oyamoquetz huehuetl oyamoman cuicatl chalco ye nicany ixtlahuacany cócotitlan y ohuaya.
Quauhythualco mittotia ye onca in tetecutin i Moteucçomatzi, Neçahualcoyotzi, chimalpopocatzi amelelquiça ixtlahuacay
...
Tollan tontlatohuaya yeehua timoteucçomatzin neçahualcoyotl huiya ticpopoloan tlalli ticxixinian chalco ye nica huiya maon netlamati moyollo yehua ohuaya.

There's a singer! Drums have appeared. Songs are spread here in Chalco, on the field in Cocotitlan.
At eagle patio the lords are dancing. There! O Montezuma, O Nezahualcoyotl, O Chimalpopoca, you're entertained on the field in Cocotitlan.
...
Among the rushes you sing. O Montezuma, O Nezahualcoyotl. Alas! You destroy the realm: you ruin Chalco here on earth. Alas, may your hearts be grieving!

— Cantares Mexicanos, fol. 31v—33v, translated from Classical Nahuatl by John Bierhorst (1985).

The Annals of Cuauhtitlan tell a story of a military campaign organized by Nezahualcoyotl which ended in complete failure, in the year 1468: (Note: Aztec calendar date: year 1 Reed (Ce acatl).) after Nezahualcoyotl finished the construction of his temple at Texcotzingo, which began construction in 1454, (Note: Aztec calendar date: year 1 Rabbit (Ce tochtli).) he implored Moctezuma to wage war against the Tzompanca, Xilotzinca, and "some" Citlaltepeca, to bring captives to sacrifice for the dedication ceremony. Moctezuma subsequently told the ruler of Cuauhtitlan to put the Tzompanca "under guard" at the Citlaltepetl (Hill of the Star). Just as Nezahualcoyotl's army prepared the assault, however, a group of women and children took it upon themselves to "be eagles and jaguars," climbing to the top of the Citlaltepetl to liberate the Tzompanca and Xolitzinca. The following morning, the unprepared Acolhua were suddenly attacked and forced into "the water at Citlaltepec." The Acolhua were routed and chased into a ravine. "Seeing this, many of the Acolhuaque were terrified, for the ravine was on fire, and the flames were rising toward them." The Acolhua army was finished off, ending Nezahualcoyotl's campaign.

== Legal system ==
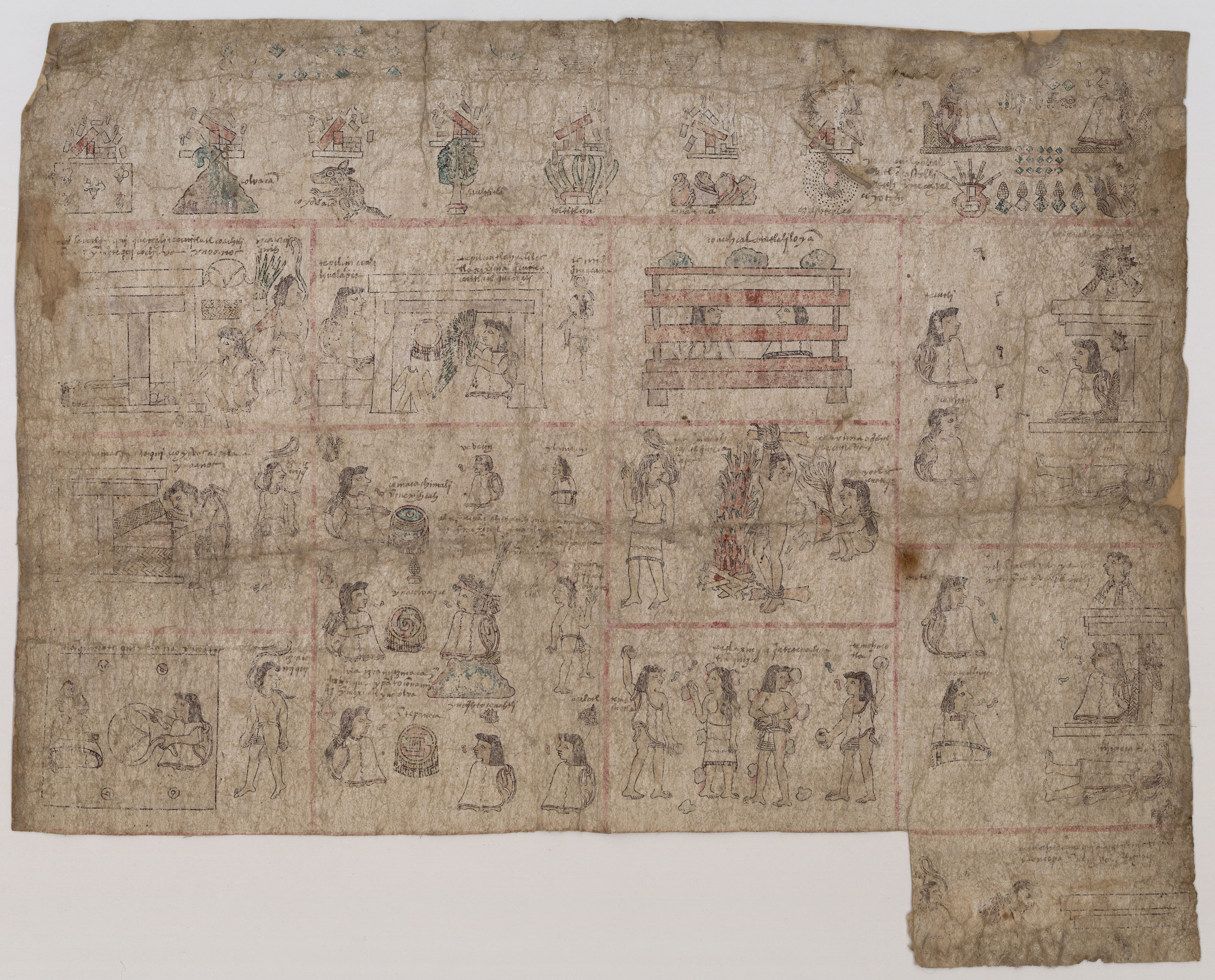
Leaf 3 of the Mapa Quinatzin, written between 1543 and 1548, depicting crimes and punishments according to Nezahualcoyotl's laws.

According to Motolinia, Nezahualcoyotl practiced his strict laws judiciously and imposed them on all his subjects. He purportedly killed four of his sons for their sexual relationships with his concubines. Cities conquered by the Aztec Empire paid tribute that was distributed among three kings. Fourteen cities in the region of Acolhuacan were under Nezahualcoyotl, including Otompan, Huexotla, Coatlinchan, Chimalhuacan, Tepetlaoztoc, Chiauhtla, Tezoyucan, Teotihuacan, Acolman, Tepechpan, Chiconauhtlan, Xicotepec, Cuauhchinanco, and Tollantzinco.

Nezahualcoyotl, himself half Mexica, adopted the Mexica religious and legal systems in Acolhuacan to help in the reconstruction of his city. Fernando de Alva Ixtlilxóchitl claims he enacted eighty laws addressing issues such as treason, robbery, adultery, homicide, alcohol abuse, misuse of inheritances, and military misconduct. The Mapa Quinatzin depicts the majority of crimes and punishments described by Ixtlilxóchitl, including the hanging of a robber for stealing or breaking into a house, as an example. It is recorded that Nezahualcoyotl enacted these laws with such severity that even some of his close family members were sentenced to death due to crimes of various types, including several of his own sons for crimes such as incest or adultery, regardless of their social status or wartime achievements. Due to the nature of this legal system, Nezahualcoyotl has been referred to by modern historians as "the Hammurabi of the New World," in reference to the Code of Hammurabi.

He established several councils in Texcoco to deal with different legal and political matters, such as a Council of War (Tequihuacalli), which dealt with all military matters, including punishing military misconduct, presided by his eldest son Acapipioltzin and his son-in-law Quetzalmamalitzin (ruler of Teotihuacan, assigned by Nezahualcoyotl), who held the titles of Tlacochcalcatl or Hueytlacoxcatl; a Council of Government or Justice, which dealt with government officials and legal matters of both the nobility and commoners, presided by two of his brothers, Cuauhtlehuanitzin and Ichantlatocatzin; a Council of Music, which seemingly possessed two academies: one for poets and another for historians, astrologers and other arts, presided by his son Xochiquetzaltzin; and a Council of Hacienda, which dealt with the tribute that was given to Texcoco from subjugated cities, presided by his son Hecahuehuetzin.

Colonial era chroniclers from Texcoco such as Juan Bautista Pomar and Ixtlilxóchitl claimed that Nezahualcoyotl's legal system was the most "civilized" in the Triple Alliance, linking his legal system with his supposed "peaceful and civilized" philosophical beliefs which contrasted with the "warlike and bloodthirsty" Mexica. These chroniclers insist that the Mexica of Tenochtitlan imitated Texcoco's legal system, with many similarities being found between the legal systems of these two major cities.

Lee (2006) rejects this idea, finding that Pomar and Ixtlilxóchitl are the only writers who claim that Tenochtitlan imitated Nezahualcoyotl's legal system, finding no evidence for this claim in other sources. While Ixtlilxóchitl's description of Nezahualcoyotl's laws is supported by other documents, such as the Mapa Quinatzin, other writers based in Texcoco, such as Fray Toribio de Benavente (also known as Motolinía) and Fray Juan de Torquemada, claim that such laws were widespread across the Triple Alliance and New Spain, finding little distinction between Texcoco's and Tenochtitlan's legal systems. Lee believes an idea contrary to Pomar and Ixtlilxóchitl, suggesting that Nezahualcoyotl used Tenochtitlan's legal system as a model for his own. His conclusion comes from the fact that he lived in Tenochtitlan during his younger years while taking refuge from the Tepanecas, suggesting that he may have received a Mexica-styled education during this period, perhaps at the Calmecac, the school of the Mexica nobility. Furthermore, it is recorded in the Anales de Tlatelolco that Nezahualcoyotl required and requested the assistance of the Mexica under the leadership of Itzcoatl and Quauhtlatoa to rebuild Texcoco and its government after the Tepanec war.

Despite his skepticism and the exaggerations of colonial-period writers, Lee does acknowledge Nezahualcoyotl's efforts in rebuilding Texcoco's legal system after reconquering it, a system which had been lost due to the war against the Tepanecas, making him "an important legislator and legal system builder Texcocan history, but not in all of Anáhuac." He concludes that "as a rebuilder of the city-state, his efforts were key to restoring and maintaining Texcocan social, political, and religious order." The judges of Texcoco under the rule of Nezahualcoyotl and his son Nezahualpilli were highly respected by the Mexica, to the extent that, according to Motolinía, they sent legal cases to Texcoco with the purpose of letting them reach a verdict and declare sentences, except in cases related to warfare.

== Achievements ==
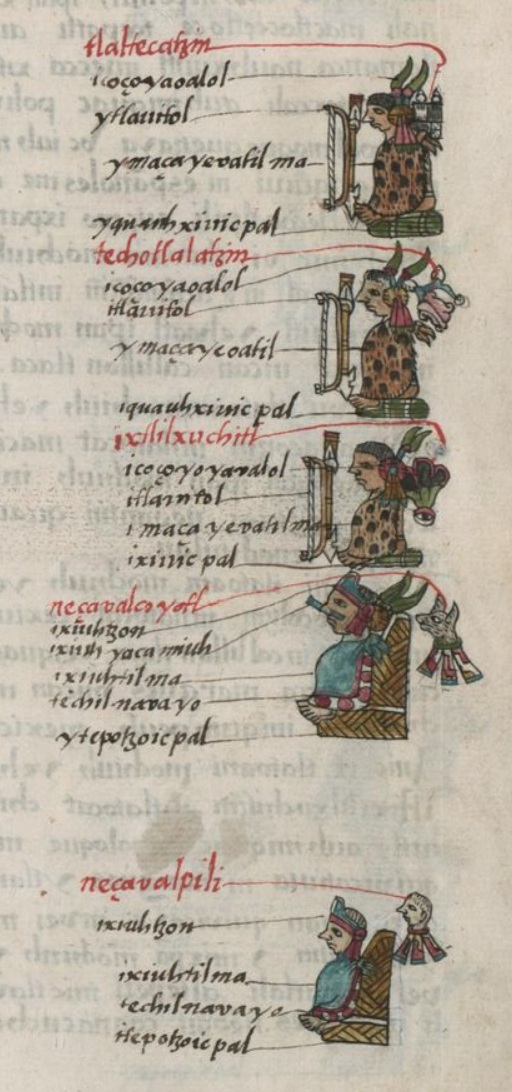
History of the royal clothes worn by the lords of Texcoco, illustrated in the Primeros Memoriales, 16th century. Nezahualcoyotl is depicted as the first king to sit on a tepotzoicpalli (throne of petate, woven reeds, with backrest), as well as the first to wear a tilmatli, turquoise diadem (xiuhuitzolli) and nose ornament (xiuhyacamitl), denoting his status as a Toltec lord. His predecessors wore animal hides (ehuatilma) and sat on simple tule seats (tolicpal), denoting them as Chichimecs. The bows and arrows in front of them are also indicators of their "barbarian" Chichimec heritage.

Nezahualcoyotl is claimed to have belonged to a group of sages known as the tlamatinime, plural word for tlamatini, which translates to "he who knows something." These were described as great thinkers in pre-Hispanic Nahua society who taught their extensive knowledge to the youth, communicating via their amoxtli (pictorial books) and songs. Modern historians have referred to Nezahualcoyotl as a "Renaissance man of Aztec culture" due to his reputation as a man of many talents.

Nezahualcoyotl is credited with cultivating what came to be known as Texcoco's golden age, which brought the rule of law, scholarship and artistry to the city and set high standards that influenced surrounding cultures. Nezahualcoyotl designed a code of law based on the division of power, which created the councils of finance, war, justice and culture (the last actually called the "Council of Music"). Texcoco became home to an extensive library that did not survive the Spanish conquest; and under his leadership, massive and impressive engineering projects were built across the Valley of Mexico, including an aqueduct system in Mexico-Tenochtitlan, among other monumental projects which have left remains that have marveled visitors and observers for centuries, such as Texcotzingo, which, as historian William H. Prescott writes, shows "Nezahualcoyotl's fondness for magnificence."

The above shows that during Nezahualcoyotl's reign, Texcoco flourished as an intellectual and cultural hub in Mesoamerica. Diego Durán described the people of Texcoco as "careful and political in everything, informed and rhetorical, their language is beautiful, elegant and clean." Diego Muñoz Camargo, likewise, referring to their way of speaking Nahuatl, stated that "the Mexican language is taken as the mother tongue, and the Texcocan language is courtly and refined." Texcoco has been called "the Athens of Anáhuac", to quote the Italian-born historian Lorenzo Boturini Benaducci.

Centuries after his death, historians worldwide continued to write about Nezahualcoyotl's achievements. Prescott, a 19th-century historian from the United States, wrote, similarly to Boturini, that "Tezcuco claimed the glory of being the Athens of the Western world. Among the most illustrious of her bards was the emperor himself,—for the Tezcucan writers claim this title for their chief, as head of the imperial alliance." This author also compared Nezahualcoyotl with Solomon and David, the wisest kings described in the Bible, though Lee (2006) finds that this comparison appears from an image of the monarch that was created by chroniclers such as Fernando de Alva Cortés Ixtlilxóchitl in an attempt to portray the culture of Texcoco as "peaceful and civilized" and make the Mexica seem "more powerful but barbarous" by comparison.

Nevertheless, Lee also recognizes Nezahualcoyotl's achievements in rebuilding his kingdom following the Tepanec war:

Nezahualcóyotl was a great ruler in Texcocan history because he not only restored his lost nation, but also expanded Texcocan territory far beyond the area his ancestors had ruled. With the help of the Mexicas and his alliance with them, Nezahualcóyotl was able to quickly make his nation second only to Tenochtitlan.

=== Engineering projects ===
The historical records claim that Nezahualcoyotl proposed and was even personally in charge of several impressive works of hydraulic engineering during his reign, having executed some of the most important works of this time during the 15th century. There is no direct evidence that these works were actually designed by him or that he personally supervised their construction, but he demonstrated great interest for large-scale civic engineering problems throughout the course of his reign. These works were not limited to his own kingdom, but to the territories of the Triple Alliance in general, and they served to benefit the general population by solving problems which affected the lives of the people living within this territory. The population continued to enjoy the results of his work decades after his death.

==== Dike of Nezahualcoyotl ====
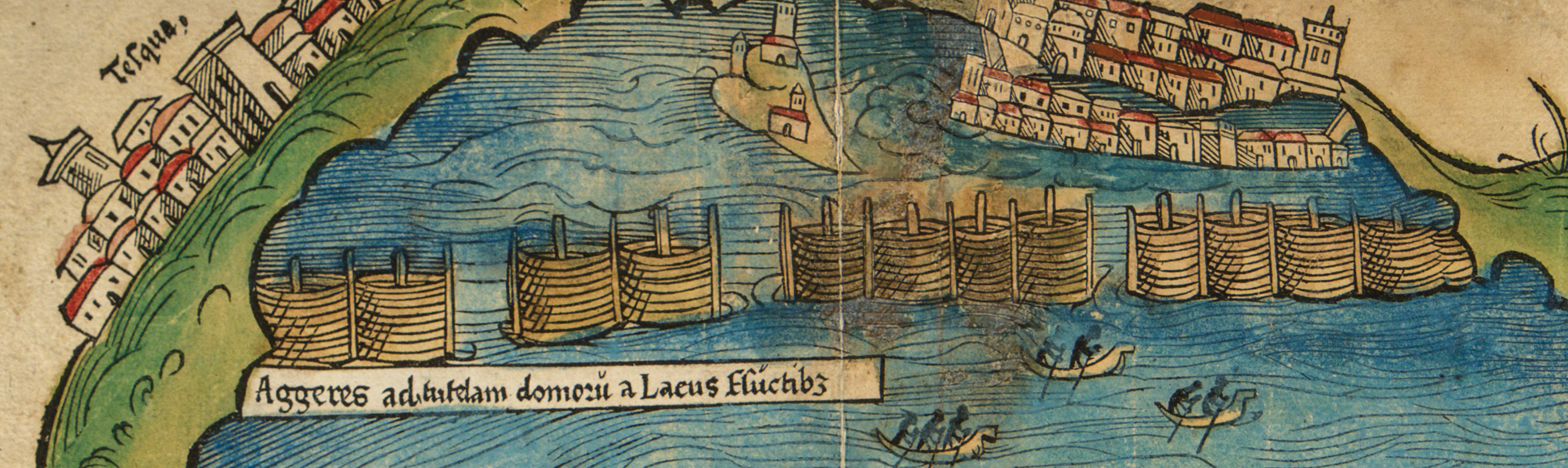
Detail of Nezahualcóyotl's dike to control water levels around Tenochtitlan, as depicted by the map of the city printed in 1524.

The Dike of Nezahualcoyotl (Albarradón de Nezahualcóyotl), also known as the "Dike of the Indians" (Albarrada de los Indios), was a major work of hydraulic engineering which divided the waters of Lake Texcoco in two, built around 1445 or 1449, when Moctezuma I, tlatoani of Mexico-Tenochtitlan (a city built in the middle of the lake), asked for Nezahualcoyotl's assistance to create a system to prevent his city from flooding due to the occasional overflow of lake, in response to a major flood which is recorded to have occurred in 1442 or 1446, the first major flood in the recorded history of the city. Nezahualcoyotl's response to Moctezuma's request was to "build an immense dike, which starting from Atzacoalco, reached Iztapalapa."

The resulting dike was built with the assistance of workers from various parts of the Valley of Mexico. Francisco Javier Clavijero records that the inhabitants of Azcapotzalco, Coyohuacan and Xochimilco were tasked with bringing "several thousands" of thick wooden logs, while other locations provided the necessary rocks for the construction, and that the construction itself was executed by the inhabitants of Tacuba, Iztapalapa, Colhuacan and Tenayuca. He also claims that the monarchs and the "magnates" themselves "set an example of hard work" to motivate the workers, with the goal of finishing construction faster, "in what otherwise would have taken many years to finish."

Map of the Valley of Mexico as it looked in 1519. The Dike of Nezahualcoyotl is indicated with a line cutting through Lake Texcoco.

The dike was approximately 16 kilometres (9.9 mi) long, 8 metres (26 ft) tall and 3.5 metres (11 ft) wide (sources vary on its exact measurements. Some sources claim its length was approximately 14.5 kilometres, which is 9.0 mi, and its height was 4 metres, which is 13 ft, while measurements of its width vary significantly. It is difficult to analyse the mechanics and measuments of the structure because it has not existed since the late 16th or early 17th centuries). According to the historical sources, the "thick wooden piles were stuck to the ground forming a hollow fence, inside the fence, big rocks and sand were deposited between the piles."

Torres-Alves & Morales-Nápoles (2020) concluded in their study on the reliability of the dike, based on the historical descriptions (using the aforementioned measurements) and environmental information, that its probability of failure was approximately 1 every 333 years provided specific initial conditions, including that the water level at the foot of the dike, at the beginning of the wet season, did not exceed 1 metre (3 ft 3 in). This probability, however, is sensitive to this initial water level, and becomes 8 times larger if the initial water level is 2 metres. There is, however, much uncertainty regarding both the lacustrine system and the dike, which makes it difficult to make a precise analysis on the reliability of the structure, and unfortunately, significant factors, such as the initial water level and the amount of area of the Lake Texcoco sub-basin which acted as a tributary area, are unknown to us. (Note: Torres-Alves & Morales-Nápoles (2020) found that, at an initial water level of 1 metre, if the tributary area was small enough (4,000 km^{2} or 1,500 sq mi), the probability of failure was 1 every 5000 years, but if it covered the entire area of the Lake Texcoco sub-basin (4,960 km^{2}, 1,920 sq mi), the probability suffered a massive increase: 1 every 24 years, but the researchers found that "this [latter] result does not comply with the description of the lifetime of the dike provided by the historical sources." The probability of failure is approximately 1 every 333 years assuming a fixed tributary area of 4,360 km^{2} (1,680 sq mi).) Nevertheless, the results of the study show that the indigenous engineers who worked on this project "had a deep understanding of the lacustrine system" and that "the Aztecs were known as the great hydraulic engineers of pre-Hispanic Mexico."

This dike is considered the most important and impressive flood-preventing work in the history of Tenochtitlan. However, its destruction began in the year of 1521 due to the beginning of the Siege of Tenochtitlan, as Spanish conquistador Hernán Cortés ordered its destruction to give way to the brigantines that besieged the city. Because the Spanish did not possess the indigenous knowledge on the workings of the city built in the middle of Lake Texcoco, major floods in Mexico City due to lake overflow became an issue throughout the following centuries, starting in the year 1553. The historical record claims that the dike never failed during its approximately 70 years of operation, a claim which seems to be supported by recent analysis of its reliability from an engineering perspective.

==== Chapultepec aqueduct ====
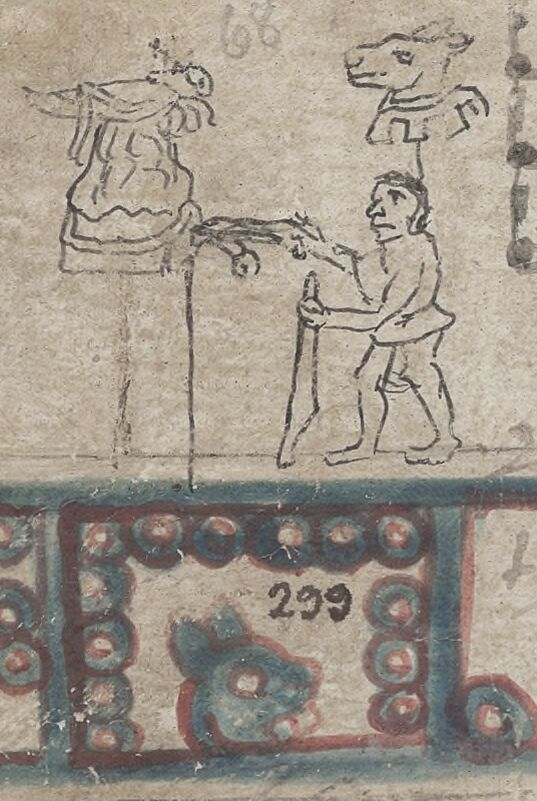
Small detail of the Codex Mexicanus, c. 17th century, depicting Nezahualcoyotl (or rather a "representative" of his, since the male figure is not shown wearing royal garments) using a uictli (a tool used for construction and agriculture) to extract water from Chapultepec, indicating his role as the leader of the aqueduct's construction. The illustration is not meant to be taken literally, it is unlikely that he personally participated in the construction.

The last major work of hydraulic engineering in Tenochtitlan built under orders of Nezahualcoyotl was the Chapultepec aqueduct, which was intended to bring the fresh water of Chapultepec to Tenochtitlan, to the comfort of his uncle Moctezuma I. This project began construction, according to Chimalpahin, in the year 1454 (1 Rabbit in the Aztec calendar) and concluded in 1466 (13 Rabbit), though the Annals of Cuauhtitlan claim its construction began much sooner, in 1463 (12 House). Chimalpahin recorded the opening as follows:

Year 13 Rabbit, 1466. It was then when the water came to Mexico City, taken from Chapoltépec, a work which the Tetzcucas had been contracted for under orders of Nezahualcoyotzin. The works took 13 years to be concluded.

This was actually the second aqueduct in the city's history built for this purpose. The first began construction around the year 1418, during the reign of Chimalpopoca. However, this first aqueduct was built out of mud mounds supported by wooden stakes, on top of various artificial islands 3 to 4 metres (9.8 to 13.1 ft) apart, thus it gradually worn away by the water it carried, and it was finally destroyed in the great flood of the 1440s some 30 years after its creation.

The aqueduct built by Nezahualcoyotl solved the issues which the first aqueduct had; his aqueduct was built higher to make it flood resistant; had two parallel channels, each of which, according to conquistador Hernán Cortés himself, was "two paces broad and about as high as a man," to ensure it could deliver clean water, even if either of the two channels required maintenance and cleanup; and it was built using resistant materials such as lime and stone, on top of a sand, lime and rock foundation. A project of such a scale was highly ambitious and required careful planning, and when a similarly ambitious project was carried out during the reign of Ahuitzotl in 1499 (decades after Nezahualcoyotl's death), to build an aqueduct fed by the springs of Coyoacán, it resulted in catastrophic failure the following year, creating a major flood which possibly led to the monarch's death, despite being worked on by "the best masons to be found in the provinces."

Historians generally believe that the water of the aqueduct was carried from Chapultepec to the north by the route of the modern-day Melchor Ocampo Causeway (in Mexico City), before converging with the Tacuba Causeway, making a right-angle turn toward the east to reach the Sacred Precinct of Tenochtitlan, in what is now the historic centre of Mexico City.

The Annals of Cuauhtitlan associate the construction of the Chapultepec aqueduct with the beginning of coatequitl—forced communal labor for the construction of public works—in Tenochtitlan:

And in this same year [12 House], in Tenochtitlan Mexico, a communal task force was put together in order to begin building the Chapoltepec aqueduct leading into Tenochtitlan. Now, the ruler of Tenochtitlan at this time was the elder Moteuczomatzin. But it was the ruler of Tetzcoco, Nezahualcoyotzin, who spoke in favor of the aqueduct.

The water brought by the aqueduct was distributed by water carriers who, as described by Hernán Cortés in his 1520 letter to the King of Spain, sold the water throughout the city via canoe. The carriers would paddle beneath the aqueduct to have their canoes filled up with the water by men positioned above them, who got paid for their labour. During the Siege of Tenochtitlan in 1521, Cortés would cut Tenochtitlan's fresh water supply by cutting and damaging the aqueduct.

==== Texcotzingo ====
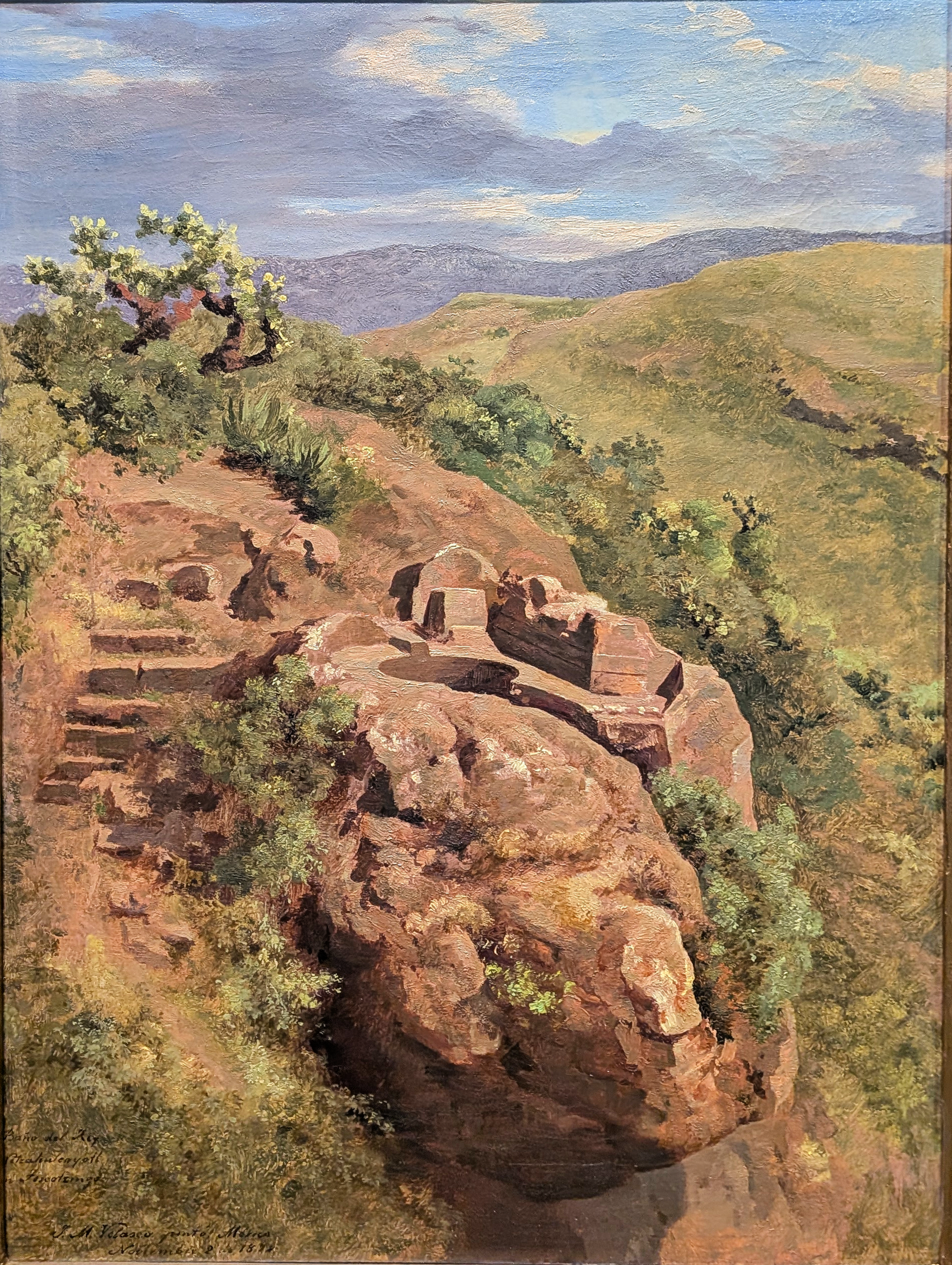
The Baths of Nezahualcóyotl, by José María Velasco Gómez, 1878. This painting depicts the so-called "Tenayuca Bath" or "King's Bath."

In what is now the town of San Nicolás Tlaminca, in Texcoco, State of Mexico, the remains of the botanical gardens of Texcotzingo (alternatively spelled as Tetzcotzinco) are to be seen. They are some of the best-preserved remains of monumental Aztec architecture. According to the Annals of Cuauhtitlan, Nezahualcoyotl designed his palace on the hill of Texcotzingo around the year 1456 (1 Rabbit) and took 13 years to finish, a year after the Chapultepec aqueduct was finished. Evans (2010) wrote regarding this work that:

the great achievement substantiating Nezahualcoyotl's multiple talents as political manipulator, sensitive intellectual, civil engineer, and designer of monumental gardens is Texcotzingo, offering evidence as solid as the rock into which his pools and reception rooms were built.

The water management system of the gardens was built using a complex of canals, aqueducts and reservoirs carved in rock, which brought water from several springs located around Cerro Tláloc, with a particular spring located at Cerro Yeloxochitl, approximately 8 kilometres (5.0 mi) south of Texcotzingo, acting as the source of the entire system, in addition to another possible source from the spring of Texapo, south of the town of Santa Catarina del Monte. The reconstructed route from the Yeloxochitl, mentioned in historical documents, is 19.5 km (12.1 mi) long, whereas the route from Texapo is 7.9 km (4.9 mi) long. The water was delivered at an elevation of about 55 metres (180 ft) below the summit of the hill. The complex has several circular-shaped reservoirs, which have been described as "the most impressive and well-known features of Tetzcotzinco's water management system"; three are known to exist at the hill of Texcotzingo and one at the hill of Metecatl. At least one of them, almost entirely monolithic, is suspected to have been used exclusively by the ruler as a ritual or recreational bath, due to its relatively small size (its volume capacity is 1,016 litres, compared to the 12,601 litres the largest reservoir can hold) and due to a seat carved inside of it, though not all researchers agree that it functioned as a bath, some arguing that it probably functioned as part of an irrigation system for the garden. This reservoir is popularly called the "Tenayuca Bath" (Baño de Tenayuca) or "King Nezahualcoyotl's Bath" (Baño del Rey [Nezahualcóyotl]). The largest reservoir, due to its size, is called the "Queen's Bath" (Baño de la Reina), which used to be decorated with three frog sculptures, each representing a member of the Triple Alliance, but they have been stolen.

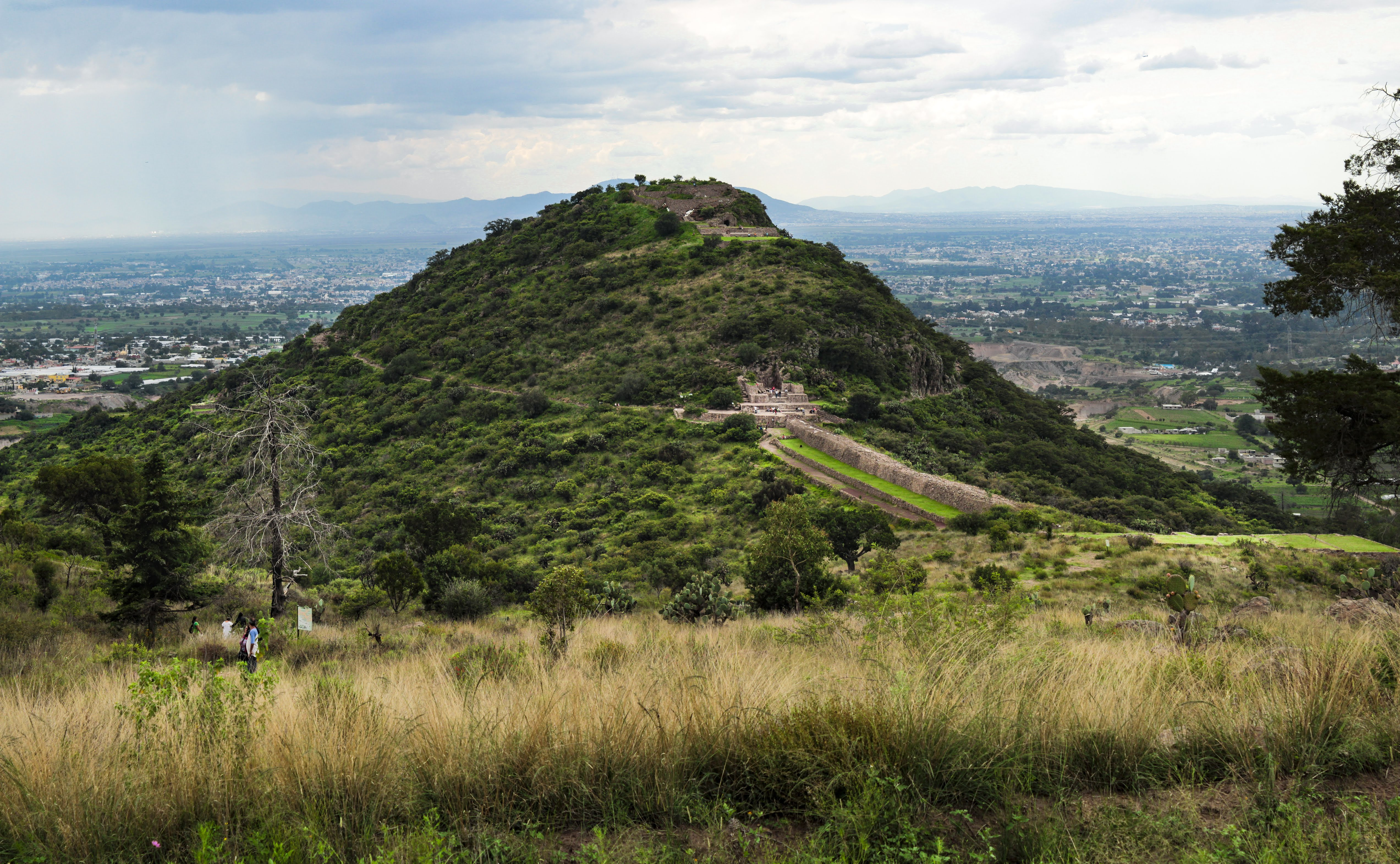
Panoramic view of the remains of Nezahualcoyotl's "baths" at Texcotzingo.

The largest remaining aqueduct in the site, connecting the hills of Texcotzingo and Metecatl, has a length reaching 170 metres (560 ft), a width of 3 metres (9.8 ft) and a maximum height of 3 metres, and it is known that it was gradually raised and expanded during the pre-Hispanic period. The water of the aqueduct splits into two smaller canals at the western end. These canals circle the central part of Texcotzingo hill. Prusaczyk, Juszczyk & Martínez Garcida (2023) were able to estimate the average water velocity of these aqueducts and canals. They estimated that the water at hill of Metecatl traveled at a velocity of about 3.84 metres (12.6 ft) per second (m/s), on the aqueduct that connects the two hills the flow velocity was about 1.02 m/s (3 1/3 ft/s) and in the main canal of Texcotzingo it was about 0.85 m/s (2 3/4 ft/s). The extremely high flow velocity at Metecatl prompted the creation of a water control mechanism. A structure known as Fuente A consisting of at least three uneven floor levels and three shallow reservoirs, which is located at the eastern end of the aqueduct and covers an area of about 1,065 m^{2} (11,460 sq ft), may have been used to reduce the slope of the canals and dispose of excess water via drainage.

Besides the engineering marvel, the gardens of Texcotzingo located on the terraces which surrounded (and still surround) the hill were decorated with flowers and trees of many sorts, which were brought from areas conquered by the Acolhua in the form of tribute. These plants were frequently used for religious and medicinal purposes, and were notable for the smell of their flowers. Species included: macpalxochitl (also known as Mexican hand tree), yolloxochitl (Mexican magnolia), eloxochitl (Magnolia dealbata), cacaloxochitl (Plumeria rubra), cacaoxochitl (Theobroma cacao) cacahuaxochitl (Quararibea funebris), tzompancuahuitl (colorines), and many more. Because these exotic species required human attention and care, most of them disappeared from Texcotzingo following the Spanish conquest of Mexico. Only native species and macpalxochitl specimens which have adapted to their environment can still be seen. This, however, is not to say that the site has lost its natural diversity, because the natural habitat of Texcotzingo is still home to many species of plants and flowers which bloom across the seasons of the year.

The so-called "Titles of Tetzcotzinco," or rather of Santa María Nativitas, written in 1537, are a document that uses oral tradition to record the grant of lands that Nezahualcoyotl conceded to his subjects, including the waters that were brought to Texcotzingo, documenting their origin and the ancient customs of Texcotzingo. The document records how Nezahualcoyotl and a local ruler named Xochpantzin (or Xochipantzin) took a tour through the region, describing the land, before ultimately building the aqueducts to transport the water:

"[...] In nehuatl NIXOCHIPANTZIN can nel ni moez[z]otzin in impampa in mopilhuantzitzin in XOCHIMANQUE in motlacatzitzinhuan in CHICHIMECAPIPILTIN in oncan cate TOCHIMINQUE, MAZAMINQUE, CIHMINQUE in motetlayecolticatzitzinhuan in XOCHIMANQUE. ma tepitzin xitechmonemactili in atzintli, in conizque in mopilhuantzitzin. ma tlacahua in motlazoyollotzin".

Niman quilhui in XOCHPANTZIN "mac amo ximotequipachocan, ca oncan ca in anmonemac, amonizque in atzintli, ma monechicocan in CHICHIMECA in conanatihue in atl moloni. ca ompa in Eloxochitla quiza, ca nel ompa ca, maxiconquihualhuicazque. Auh ye cenca anmoezzotica anquitlanizque inic anquihualhuicazque, inic anquihualyacanazque anmociahuiliztica inancaxitiquihue inic antlatequipanozque in oncan nochantzinco Tetzcotzinco".

Ye niman quinhuicac in NEZAHUALCOYOTZIN in ompa Yeloxochitla; ompa moch quittiti in XOCHPANTZIN in tetepeme, ihuan quilhui, "Nopiltzine, ca ye nican in toctoc. ma xicmohuiquilli in atl, ca ye motlatquitzin. [...]"

"[...] I, XOCHIPANTZIN, am verily of thy blood, through thy sons, the XOCHIMANQUE; thy people the CHICHIMEC princes, to wit: the TOCHIMINQUE, the MAZAMINQUE, the CIHMINQUE; thy servitors the XOCHIMANQUE. Grant us water, for thy children to drink; bestow thy bounty".

Then he [Nezahualcoyotl] said to XOCHIPANTZIN, "Do not worry, because yonder's what you ask for, the water you will drink. Let the CHICHIMECA assemble and go and take the springing water. It rises in Yelloxochitlan, in truth, it is there; fetch it hither. And by virtue of your blood you will obtain it so as to bring it here so as to guide it here, by your toil you will fetch it in order to work in my town, Tetzcotzinco."

Then NEZAHUALCOYOTL took them to Yelloxochitlan; there he showed all the hills to XOCHIPANTZIN, and said, "My son, know that they're full: carry off the water, for it's yours. [,,,]"

— Translated from Classical Nahuatl by Byron McAfee and R. H. Barlow (1946).

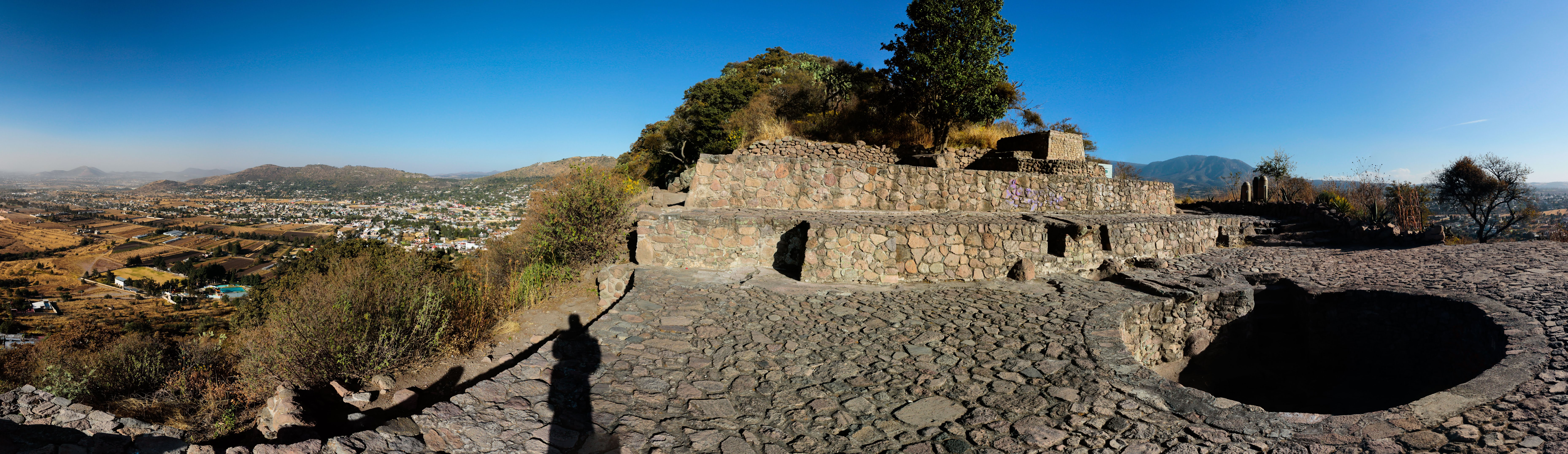
Panorama of the "Queen's Bath," the largest reservoir of the Texcotzingo complex.

== Poetry, philosophy and religion ==
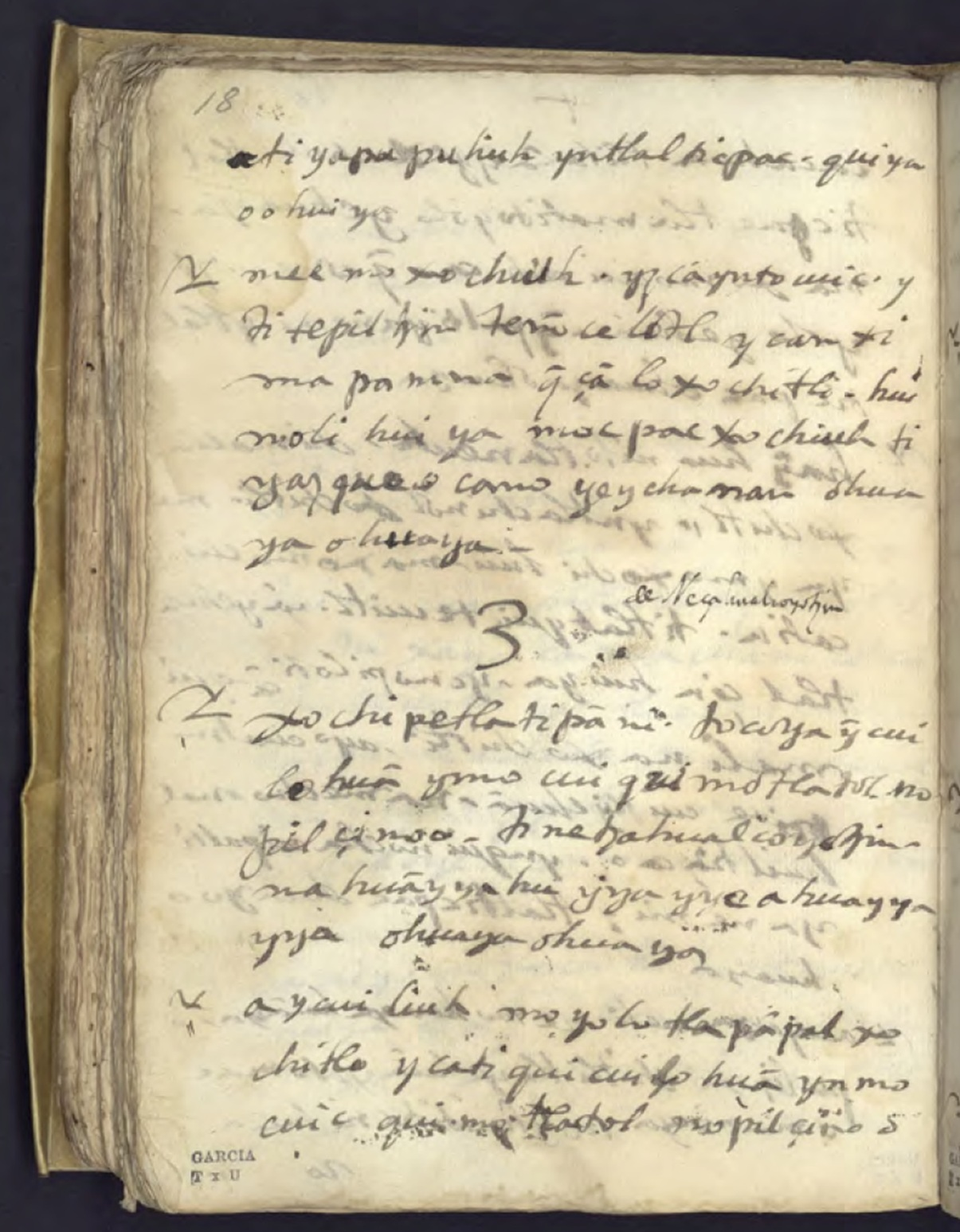
Romances de los señores de Nueva España, fol. 18v, containing a poem describing Nezahualcoyotl's poetry.

While Nezahualcoyotl's achievements as a warrior, legislator and architect, and his difficult younger years made him a famous figure in the pre-Hispanic period, today he is best remembered as a great poet and philosopher whose fame was greater than that of any other poet of his time, even when compared to his fellow poet-monarchs. Miguel León-Portilla claims that Nezahualcoyotl was a tlamatini, literally "the one who knows," a sage. One poem from Culhuacan demonstrates the praise he received from his contemporaries:

xochipetlatipȃni · tocoyaycuilohuȃ y mocuiqu i motlatol nopilçin oo - tinetzahualcoyotzinn ahuȃyyahui yya yye ahuayya yya ohuaya ohuaya
a ycuiliuh moyolo tlapȃpalxochitlo yca tiquicuilohuȃ yn mocuicqu i motlatol nopilçin oo tinetzahualcoyotzinn ahuayyahu yya yye - ahuȃyya yya ohuaya ohuaya

On this flower mat you paint your songs, your words, my prince, you, Nezahualcoyotzin.
Ah, your heart is painted. As multicolored flowers you paint your songs, your words, my prince, you, Nezahualcoyotzin.

— Romances de los señores de Nueva España, fol. 18v—19r, translated from Classical Nahuatl by John Bierhorst (2009).

The tlamatinime, sages, were Nahua philosophers, theologists and scholars. A sage was described as "he who possesses the amoxtli (book) and the black and red inks," and one of the roles they possessed in society was to teach young people "all their songs, their divine songs, teocuicatl, following the contents of their books." This manner of teaching was known as amoxohtoca, meaning "to follow the road or sequence registered in the book." Additionally, Miguel León-Portilla states that a tlamatini "meditates and tells about the enigmas of man on earth, the beyond, and the gods," subsequently making poetry their ordinary form of expression, "like several of the pre-Socratic thinkers." Religious authorities banned many ancient songs from being performed following the Spanish conquest of Mexico, but they did not successfully stop all of these ancient songs from being recited by the indigenous peoples. Nevertheless, some Christian priests admired the expressions of ancient Nahua poetry, and, according to León-Portilla, "they were to their eyes ... as worthy of preservation as had been the compositions of other 'pagans' such as the Romans and Greeks."

Pre-Hispanic poems created by the peoples of Mesoamerica could be preserved in the 16th and 17th centuries by means of oral tradition and memory combined, according to León-Portilla, with pictorial documents, known as codices. Nahuatl writing, although limited in many aspects, could be used to write down dates, places, names, attributes of deities and abstract concepts. Thus, despite its limitations, it is possible to "read" and transcribe the meaning of pictorial documents in latin characters. In the context of poetry, "priests, sages, rulers and young students in the native schools and temples" learning these pre-Hispanic poems could use these documents to memorise and recite poems, passing them down to the generations that came after them. The usage of codices to memorise poems is attested by 16th-century writers such as Bernardino de Sahagún, a Franciscan linguist-ethnographer, though he refers specifically to divine chants which were taught at the Calmecac, the higher education school for the children of the nobility and priesthood. Nezahualcoyotl's poems, however, were not religious in nature; the poems attributed to him may not have been written down like divine chants were. The primary method of learning poems in the pre-Hispanic period, as attested by other writers of the period, was through memory and dance.

Nezahualcoyotl's poems, as well as many other poems from various authors, known or anonymous, post-conquest and pre-conquest, are preserved mainly in two colonial-era manuscripts. the Cantares Mexicanos and the Romances de los señores de Nueva España. The Cantares manuscript was written in the late 16th century, sometime between 1585 and 1597, but its contents appear to have been copied from now-lost originals which would have been produced in the 1550s, 1560s and 1570s, possibly by indigenous informants who collected the manuscript's poems for Bernardino de Sahagún. The Romances were preserved with the Relación of Juan Bautista Pomar, which was composed in 1582. Therefore, the Romances may have been originally compiled in the same time period, though the surviving manuscript is believed to be from the 17th century. According to León-Portilla, poems attributed to Nezahualcoyotl include, among others:

- In chololiztli icuic (Song of the Flight)
- Ma zan moquetzacan (My Friends, Stand Up!)
- Nitlacoya (I Am Sad)
- Xopan cuicatl (Song of Springtime)
- Ye nonnocuiltonohua (I Am Wealthy)
- Zan yehuan (He Alone)
- Xon Ahuiyacan (Be Joyful)

=== Poetic themes ===
==== Ephemerality of human life ====
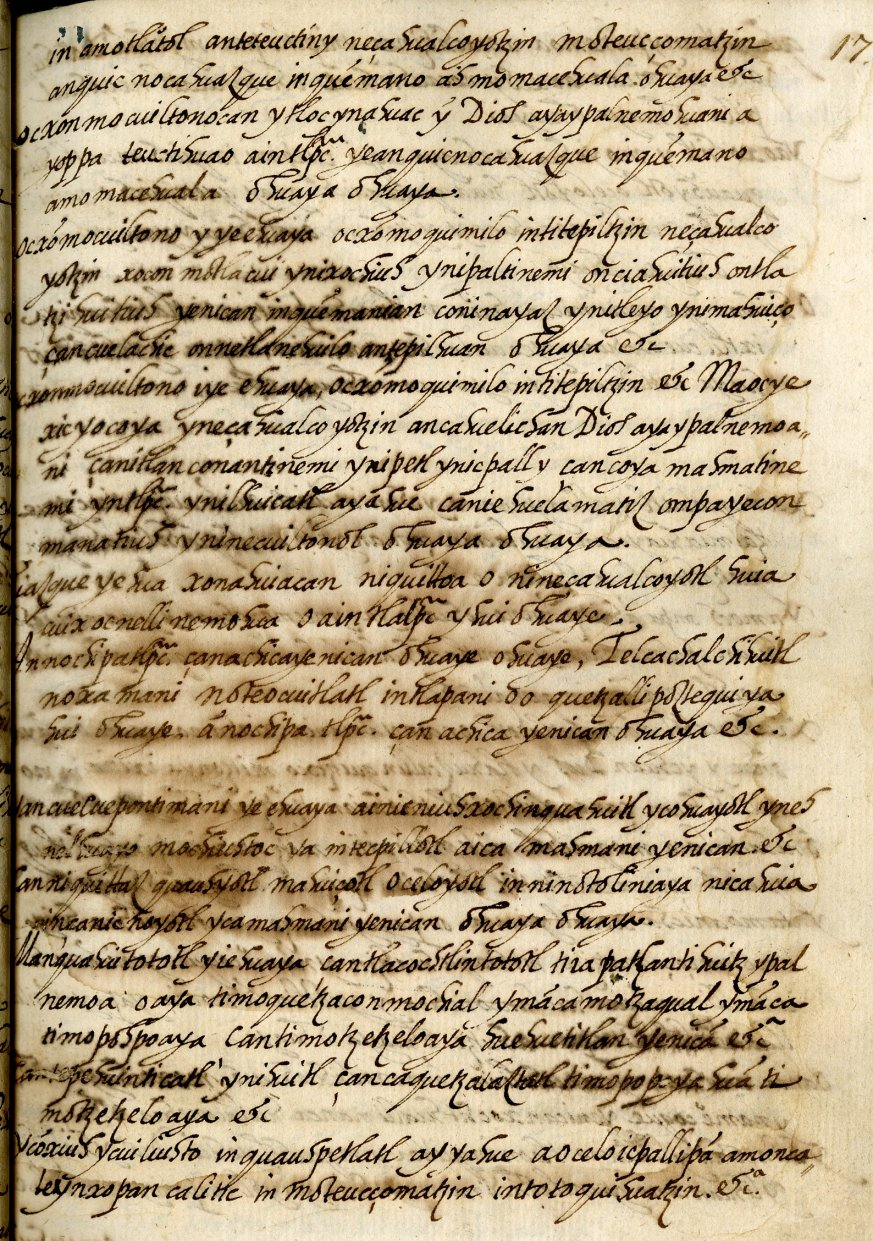
Cantares Mexicanos, fol. 17r, containing one of Nezahualcoyotl's iconic stanzas.

A consistent theme exhibited in many of the poems attributed to the monarch is the ephemerality of human life. One iconic stanza attributed to him exhibiting this theme, which is part of a larger poem, is the following:

Tiazque yehua xonahuiacan niquittoa o nineçahualcoyotl huia cuix oc nelli nemohua o a in tlalticpac y hui ohuaye
Annochipa tlalticpac çan achica ye nican ohuaye ohuaye, Tel ca chalchihuitl no xamani no teocuitlatl in tlapani oo quetzalli poztequi yahui oyahue. anochipa tlalticpac. çan achica ye nican ohuaya.

We're to pass away. I say, "Be pleasured!"—I that am Nezahualcoyotl. Ah, do we truly live on earth?
Not forever on earth, but briefly here. Even jades are shattered. Gold, broken. Ah! plumes, splintered. Not forever on earth, but briefly here.

— Cantares Mexicanos, fol. 17r, translated by John Bierhorst (1985).

Nezahualcoyotl's awareness of time and change, or cahuitl—"that which leaves us," as León-Portilla writes—is shown in many poems and verses attributed to him, where he observes that everything on earth—tlalticpac—is merely transitory; not even gold and jade are safe from the passage of time, let alone human beings, who are more fragile. This fact causes Nezahualcoyotl's grief, but it also leads to him finding his own way to live, which is through "flower and song"—in xochitl in cuicatl, the Nahuatl metaphor for poetry, which he believed to be eternal, unlike anything material. This is demonstrated in poems which were performed in the palaces of Mexico and Acolhuacan. The following stanza is from the same poem quoted above, which is a dialogue between Nezahualcoyotl and a nameless singer:

Maoc xoyaticay oc xoncuepontica yn tlalticpac y timolinia tepehui xochitl timotzetzeloa yohuaya ohuaya, ahtlamiz noxochiuh ahtlamiz nocuic yn noconyayehuaya çan nicuicanitl huia xexelihuiya moyahua yaho coçahuaya xochitl ça ye oncalaquilo çaquan calitica ohuaya ohuaya

Live and blossom here on earth. As you move, shaking, flowers fall. Eternal are the flowers, eternal are the songs that I, the singer, lift. Parceled out, dispersing, they turn to gold: the troupial enters the house.

— Cantares Mexicanos, fol. 16v, translated by John Bierhorst (1985).

Ephemerality is not a subject unique to the poems of Nezahualcoyotl, and it seems to have been a rather popular subject among Nahua poets in general. An anonymous Huexotzincan poet even used the same metaphors as Nezahualcoyotl in one of the poems featured in the Cantares. Ephemerality is also featured in Mexica poems, though their authors use different metaphors to convey similar ideas.

==== War songs ====
Contrary to popular belief, Nahuatl poetry was not always peaceful; warfare and sacrifice were common themes featured in various poems. War was taken as a necessity for pre-Hispanic rulers in order to obtain captives, which were sacrificed as a means of nourishing the gods with their blood, so that the universe can continue. As the result, the people of central Mexico regarded taking captives in war as a truly admirable act, and at the same time, warriors had the desire to be sacrificed themselves. This necessity and desire was reflected occasionally in the works of Nahua poets, and Nezahualcoyotl was not an exception. Ángel María Garibay and José Luis Martínez Rodríguez attribute the following stanza to the king:

çȃ ye monecuiltonol ypalnemohuani / ytzimiquixochitli / yaomiquiztla ya · hahua on oo aya a ohuȃya ohuȃya
yaomiquiztica yehuȃya o hamo miximati tiyaz
yaotepȃn i tlachinolnahuac amiyximati
chimalteuhtli motecȃ yehuȃ tlacochayahuitli çã moteca yehua
y cuix oc neli ȏ neyximȃchoya y qnonamicãn iya ohuȃ yehuaya ohuaya
çȃniyo yn teyotl / tocayotl aya yaȏmicohua yehuȃya achin ihuic ximohuȃ

Your riches. O Life Giver! The flower of knife death, war death.
Through war death aren't they recognized? Oh, you must pass away!
In war, in blaze aren't they recognized?
Shield dust is pouring down, spear mist, pouring down.
Is it true that one is recognized in the place unknown?
Only for fame and renown does one die in war. In this way, and soon, one is shorn.

— Romances de los señores de Nueva España, fol. 36, translated by John Bierhorst (2009).

In this song, Nezahualcoyotl praises the obsidian-knife death—itzimiquiliztli—and war death—yaomiquiliztli—of sacrificial victims to the gods; victims who are described as "flowers." This song, rather explicitly, was conceived with the intention of promoting war and sacrifice.

=== Authorship ===
Although many poems have historically been attributed to Nezahualcoyotl, it is difficult to tell for certain which of the surviving ones were actually composed by him, if any. As early as the 1880s, some Mexican writers, such as Alfredo Chavero, had openly questioned the authorship of these poems, claiming that "the truth is, we know no specimens of the ancient poetry, and those, whether manuscript or printed, which claim to be such, date from after the Conquest." Daniel Garrison Brinton, in response, wrote in 1890 that he did believe the poems to be of pre-conquest origin, "written down shortly after the Nahuatl language had been reduced to the Spanish alphabet."

In the collections of the Cantares Mexicanos and the Romances de los señores de Nueva España, several poems are referred to as "Song of Nezahualcoyotl" (Ycuic neçahualcoyotzin in the Cantares, de Neçahualcoyotzin in the Romances), implying that he's the author or main subject. Additionally, several poems, within their own content, mention Nezahualcoyotl explicitly as their singer (e.g. "I that am Nezahualcoyotl"), which historians such as Ángel María Garibay find as sufficient evidence that such poems were composed by the monarch. However, this does not necessarily mean that these songs were composed by Nezahualcoyotl. In fact, a poem entitled "Song of Nezahualpilli" (Ycuic neçahualpilli) is explicitly stated to have been composed by a singer named Tececepouhqui, not by Nezahualpilli. Moreover, Tececepouhqui never mentions himself in the content of the poem. This makes arguments such as Garibay's stand on shaky ground, and demonstrates, according to Bierhorst (1985), that it is not possible to confirm that the tlatoque (kings) of the Aztec Empire actually composed the songs historically attributed to them.

The above, however, is not evidence that the poems in question could not have been composed by Nezahualcoyotl or that poet-kings did not exist. Don Baltasar Toquezcuauhyo, tlatoani (king) of Colhuacan, is specifically referred to as a composer in the Cantares, serving as an example of a ruler who was certainly a poet, even though the importance of Colhuacan after the Spanish conquest did not come close to Texcoco's during Nezahualcoyotl's reign. Furthermore, tlatoque in the pre-Hispanic period did dance and sing, and, as Sahagún stated, they would try to "learn a new song," though their material was prepared by professional singers.

Notably, Bierhorst observes that the majority of 16th-century historians who wrote about Nezahualcoyotl did not describe him as a poet. Among the earliest historians to have clearly described him as such are Fray Juan de Torquemada and Fernando de Alva Ixtlilxóchitl (the latter of which was a direct descendant of his), in the 17th century. Juan Bautista Pomar (also a descendant) may have thought of him as a composer earlier, in the late 16th century. The authorship of the poems historically attributed to Nezahualcoyotl remains a subject of serious debate among scholars of Aztec culture.

=== Religious beliefs ===
Nezahualcoyotl's reputation as a famous philosopher, and lack of knowledge of indigenous sources, resulted in post-conquest writers creating fantasies about his religious beliefs which contradict the reality of pre-Hispanic Mesoamerica. Various writers described him as a monotheist who was openly skeptical about Aztec religion, claiming that he discovered "the One and Only God, the cause of all things." Modern researchers generally agree that such ideas are fantasies of obvious European origin, presumably created for the purpose of converting the indigenous peoples into Christianity, using Nezahualcoyotl's reputation as a skilled leader.

One such writer who supported the monotheist idea was historian William H. Prescott, using Fernando de Alva Ixtlilxóchitl as his source; this historian wrote the following story: Nezahualcoyotl, despite being married for some years, failed to have a child with his wife, to his grievance; his priests came to the conclusion that the only remedy was to perform human sacrifices to satisfy the gods. Nezahualcoyotl reluctantly accepted, but the sacrifices proved to be in vain, promting him to exclaim that "these idols of wood and stone can neither hear nor feel; much less could they make the heavens, and the earth, and man, the lord of it. These must be the work of the all-powerful, unknown God, Creator of the universe, on whom alone I must rely for consolation and support." At Texcotzingo, after fasting, praying and making offerings of copal, and aromatic herbs and gums for 40 days, he converted to monotheism, openly professing his new faith and building a temple dedicated to "the unknown God, the Cause of causes," where no images were allowed inside, and human or blood sacrifices were strictly forbidden. This same sort of story was written by one of Nezahualcoyotl's descendants, Juan Bautista Pomar, in 1582.

The practice of human sacrifice, which had long existed in Mesoamerica before the formation of the Aztec Empire, had been enhanced and encouraged in the city of Mexico-Tenochtitlan by Tlacaelel, as part of his religious and political reforms, increasing the number of sacrficies to nourish the gods. Nezahualcoyotl, along with the tlamatinime (sages) in general, has typically been presented as a figure whose ideas differed from Tlacaelel's "mystical-warrior vision," being portrayed as a ruler who opposed the practice.

Lee (2003) argues that these notions of Nezahualcoyotl that portray him as a peaceful monotheist who opposed human sacrifice are historically inaccurate, rejecting the idea of separating the rulers of Texcoco from the Mexica rulers. He argues that the duties and obligations of pre-conquest rulers, as described by historical documents such as the Florentine Codex, were to maintain "the existing political, religious, and cultural order," doing so by arranging wars, rewarding the achievements of accomplished warriors, rehearsing the sacrficie of captives, and ordering dancing and singing. Thus, Nezahualcoyotl's duties as ruler were far from opposing the religious establishment; rather, he had the obligation to maintain it. Furthermore, Nezahualcoyotl was established as ruler of Texcoco with the support of his uncle Itzcoatl, the king of Tenochtitlan, in addition to the fact that he based himself on the religious and legal systems of Tenochtitlan to re-establish order in his own nation.

== Personal life ==
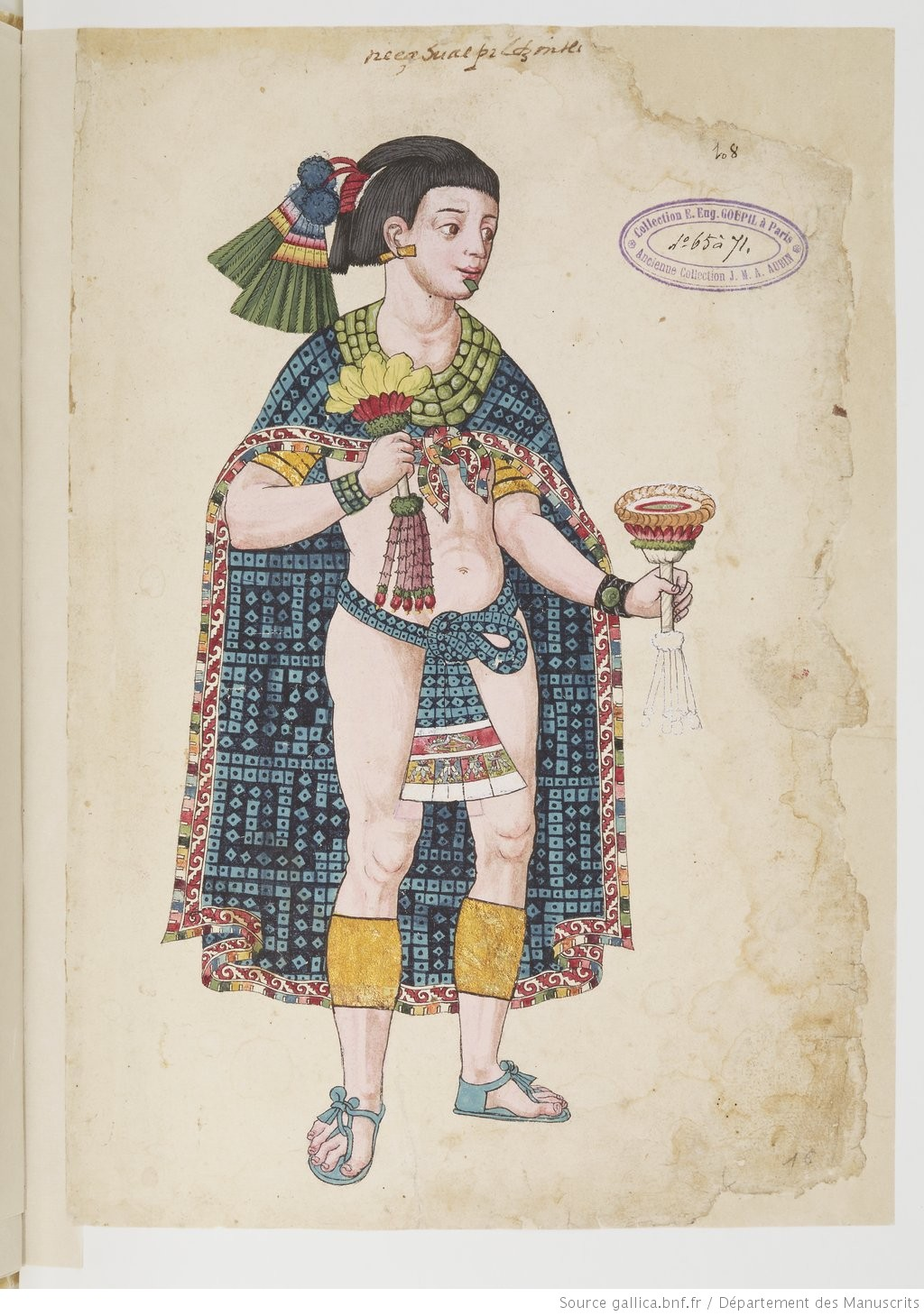
Son of Nezahualcoyotl: Nezahualpilli. Posthumous portrait in the Codex Ixtlilxochitl.

Nezahualcoyotl had a large number of illegitimate children due to his large number of concubines, which, according to José Luis Martínez Rodríguez, numbered between twenty or thirty. Fernando de Alva Ixtlilxóchitl, one of his direct descendants, stated he had sixty sons and fifty-seven daughters. He only had two legitimate sons, named Tetzauhpiltzintli and Nezahualpilli, adding up to a total of 119 children. Born around 1464 (11 Flint) or 1465 (12 House) (according to Fernando de Alva Ixtlilxóchitl, on January 1, 1465), (Note: Aztec calendar date: day 12 Snake (Matlactliome cóatl) of the year 11 Flint (Matlactlioce técpatl), 8th day of the 15th month (Atemoztli, numbered in other sources as the 16th, 17th or 1st month).) Nezahualpilli would become Nezahualcoyotl's successor in the throne, ruling until his death the 16th century.

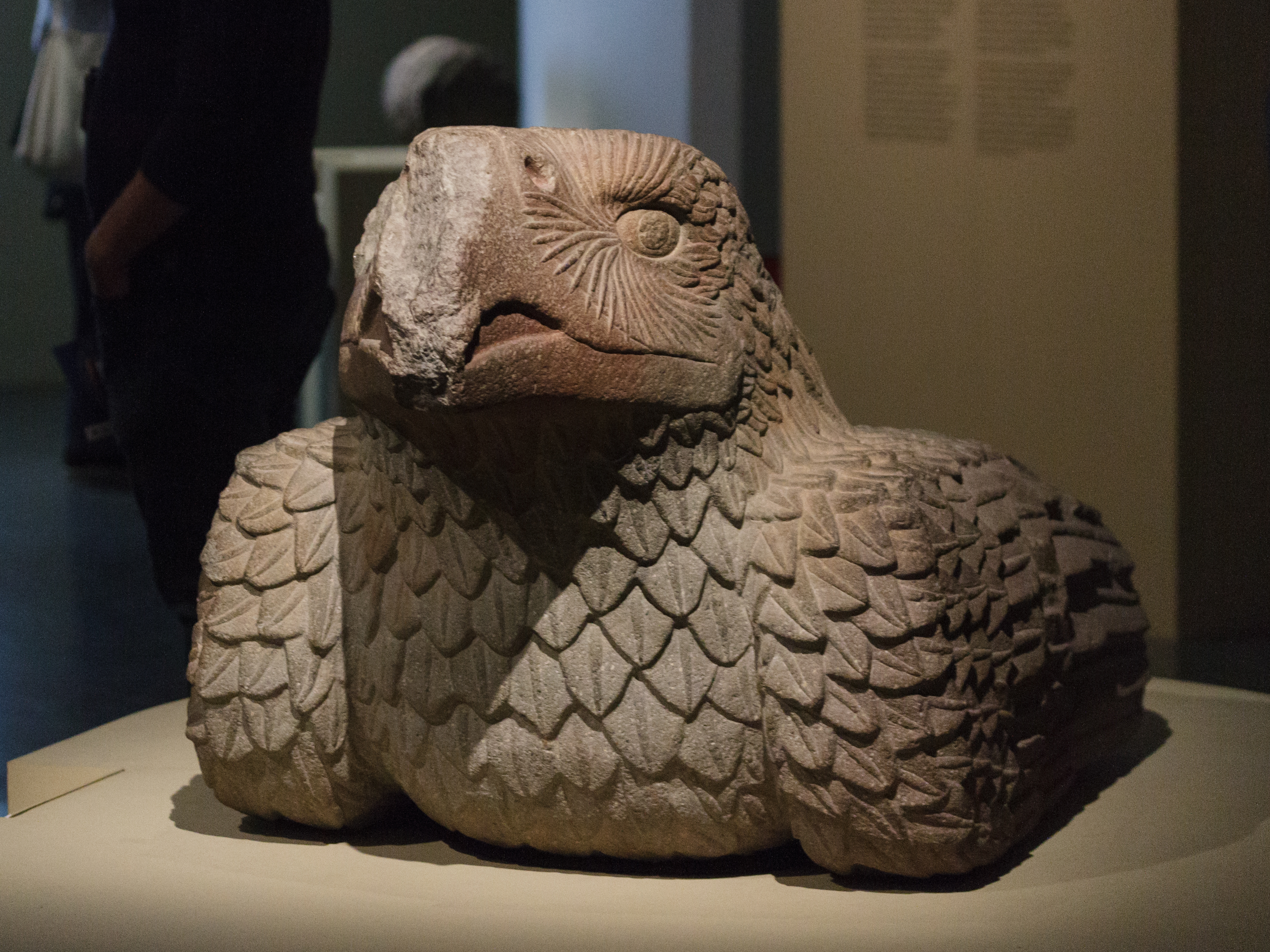
Mexica sculpture of an eagle, which served as a cuauhxicalli, at the museum of the Templo Mayor, Mexico City.

The lives of the majority of Nezahualcoyotl's children are unknown. Only little is known about the lives of sixteen sons and three daughters. Several sons occupied important positions in the government and military; Xochiquetzaltzin, as an example, served as head of the academy of historians and astrologers, and was also an accomplished military leader who participated in the conquest of the Huastec province of Pánuco, along with his brother Acamapipioltzin. Other sons had other occupations, such as Huetzin, who was described as an accomplished sculptor, who once "carved a precious stone into the shape of a bird, so natural it appeared to be alive."

Nezahualcoyotl lost several of his sons to various circumstances. We are told that one son, who is not named in surviving sources, was sentenced to death after being found guilty of committing sodomy (pecado nefando, lit. "heinous sin" in Spanish), in spite of being "very brave and courageous." Four other sons were also sentenced to death for committing incest with their stepmothers. It is also known that he lost two sons during his war against Chalco. In one account, Xochiquetzaltzin and a brother of his were the ones captured and killed while they were hunting within the Chalco area (this Xochiquetzaltzin may not have been the same as the one who participated in the conquest of Pánuco; another Xochiquetzaltzin acted as a military commander during the war on Chalco, along with his brothers Ichantlahtohuatzin and Axoquentzin). By another account, the name of one of the two sons who were killed was Moxiuhtlacuiltzin.

The loss of his firstborn legitimate son, Tetzauhpiltzintli, was the most important to Nezahualcoyotl. In his Relaciones, Fernando de Alva Ixtlilxóchitl just writes that "for being very cruel and for other things that his father found about him, he was put to death." However, this same author writes a significantly different and lengthier story in his History of the Chichimec people (Historia de la nación chichimeca). In it, he writes that one of Tetzauhpiltzintli's illegitimate brothers, Eyahue, falsely accused him of planning to commit treason, as Eyahue's mother (a concubine) wanted her sons to inherit the throne of Texcoco, seeing Nezahualcoyotl's legitimate son as an obstacle (Nezahualpilli had not yet been born). His property was subsequently investigated, and a large collection of weapons he possessed was used as evidence against him. Nezahualcoyotl thus called upon the kings Moctezuma I of Tenochtitlan and Totoquihuaztli I of Tlacopan to punish him as they deemed fit. Resultingly, to Nezahualcoyotl's shock, Tetzauhpiltzintli was killed. When Nezahualcoyotl was informed of the death of his only legitimate son, he cried in anguish and mourned him for many days in Texcotzingo. Lesbre (2001) finds that the story told in the History of the Chichimec people is remarkably similar to the biblical story of King David and his son Absalom, meaning that Alva Ixtlilxóchitl probably used this story to accentuate the parallels between Nezahualcoyotl and this biblical figure. This would not be the only case in which scholars have found parallels between the Bible and Nezahualcoyotl's biography as described in 16th and 17th-century histories. The story of Nezahualcoyotl's marriage with Azcalxochitzin also bears important similarities.

=== Controversial marriage with Azcalxochitzin ===
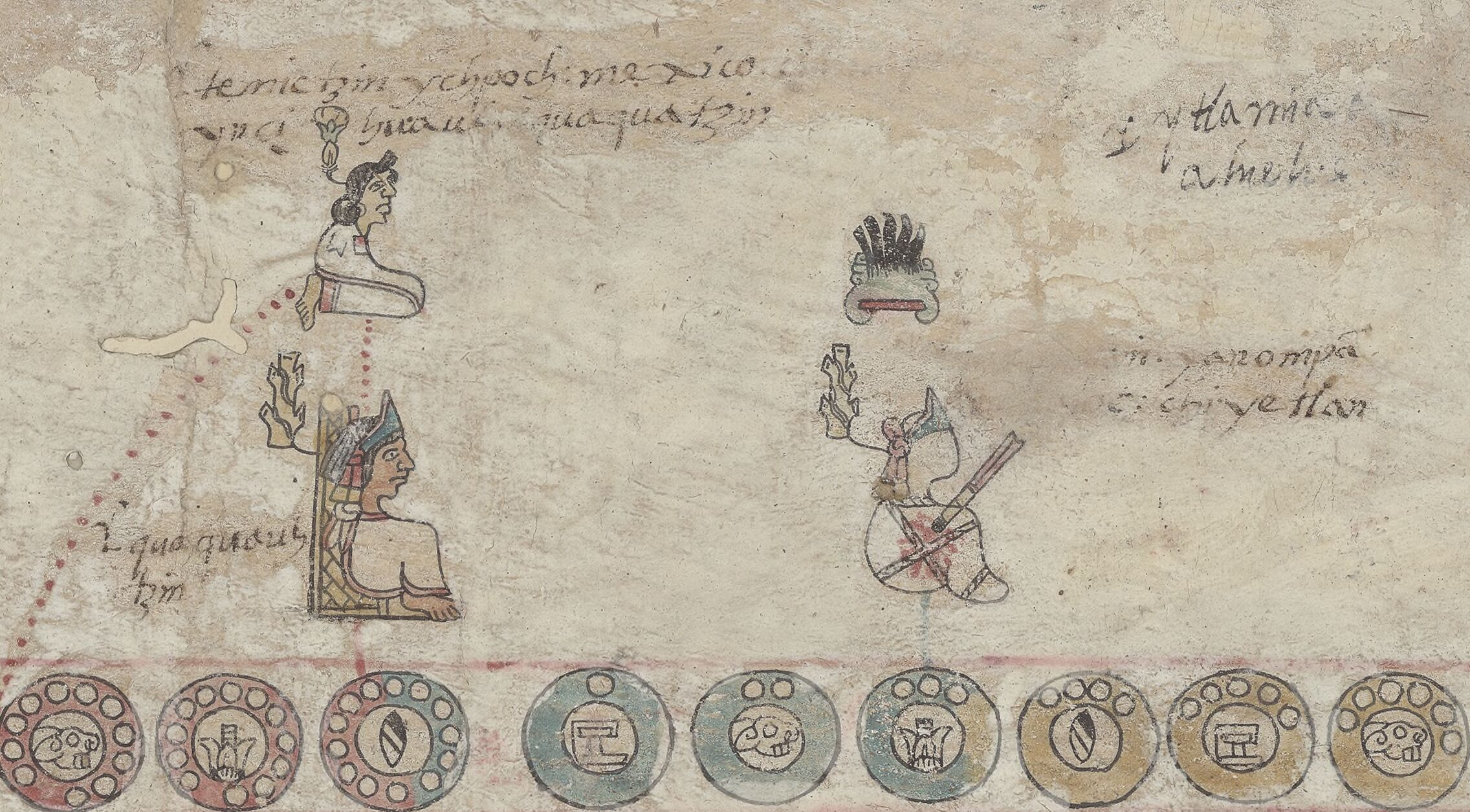
Detail of the Tira de Tepechpan, depicting Cuacuauhtzin's enthronement as lord of Tepechpan (at the left), accompanied by Azcalxochitzin (sitting above him). Three years later, he is assassinated, as indicated by the bloody arrow piercing his funerary bundle.

Azcalxochitzin was a Mexica noblewoman, daughter of a nobleman named Temictzin (who is described as Nezahualcoyotl's uncle, making her his first cousin) and granddaughter of the kings of Tenochtitlan, related to Chimalpopoca and Huitzilihuitl, and she would become the mother of Tetzauhpiltzintli and Nezahualpilli, as Nezahualcoyotl's principal wife. However, her marriage with Nezahualcoyotl was not planned, for she was meant to marry the ruler of Tepechpan, Cuacuauhtzin. Tepechpan was a city under the domains of Texcoco, and its rulers were loyal subjects of Nezahualcoyotl. In fact, according to Fernando de Alva Ixtlilxóchitl and the Codex Xolotl, Nezahualcoyotl restored the rightful ruler of the city after the Tepanec War. Despite this, however, "blinded by love and desire" (or rather as punishment for disloyalty), Nezahualcoyotl took the decision of assassinating Cuacuauhtzin, despite his demonstrations of loyalty, in order to marry his fiancée (although in pictorial documents they are depicted as already married).

According to Alva Ixtlilxóchitl, this assassination was performed in secret, and the only historians who knew about it, according to this author, were "his son and grandsons," who strongly condemned him for this action, though this author minimizes the assassination by stating that "this is the only wicked and reprehensible action of his they could find, and even in this case he was blinded by love and desire." The Tira de Tepechpan, a manuscript from the second half of the 16th century, seemingly confirms, at least partly, the story told by Ixtlilxóchitl, the document shows that Cuacuauhtzin died just three years after being enthroned, and that his death was not due to natural causes.

As Alva Ixtlilxóchitl "colourfully" tells, Nezahualcoyotl was not yet married by the time he met Azcalxochitzin, and thus had no legitimate heir to the throne, despite having many children from the concubines in his palace. He initially had the intention of marrying a daughter of the lords of Huexotla or Coatlinchan, until he made a visit to the city of Tepechpan, where he had a banquet with its ruler Cuacuauhtzin. It was during this banquet when he met Azcalxochitzin, who was not yet married to Cuacuauhtzin due to her young age (according to Fray Juan de Torquemada, she was 17 years old when this banquet took place). Ixtlilxóchitl claims Nezahualcoyotl immediately fell in love with the young woman, and thus, he secretly plotted Cuacuauhtzin's assassination after returning to Texcoco. He plotted an arranged battle between Tlaxcallan and Tepechpan, falsely accusing Cuacuauhtzin of "committing a serious crime" (delito grave) to justify his killing. When Cuacuauhtzin was subsequently notified of the battle that was to take place, he was bewildered, but chose to obey his orders as a loyal vassal.

The following stanza is part of a poem attributed to Cuacuauhtzin, which he supposedly performed during a banquet before his final battle:

canelpȃ toyazque yn ayc timiquizq maçȃ nichalchihuitl niteocuitlatl o çȃ ye o nipiçȃloz nimamalihuaz i tlatilan o çã noyoli yo çã ye nicuacuauhtzin çã ninentlamatia yo aye yo ahuayo ohuiya
mochalchiuhteponaz moxiuhqcholiquiquiçin tocoyapiçãya çȃ ye tiyoyotzinni oyahualaçic a oya moqueçãco ya y cuicanitla yyohuiya
...
y ma ya moyolo motoma y ma ya moyolo ma açintinemiya tinechcocoliya tinechmiquitlani yn onoya ye ychȃn in onopulihui aca çã yoquic oo noca tihualichocani nonopolihui noca tihualycnotlamati çȃ tinocni o çã ye niyao çã ye niyauh ye ychan ohuaya ohuaya

"Where might we go, so as never to die? Though I be jade, or gold, I'll be smelted, or drilled on the mound." Ah! I'm born, I, Cuacuauhtzin, and I grieve.
Your precious log drums! You blow your conch for turquoise swans, you, Yoyontzin. The singer arrives, he appears.
...
"Let your hearts be set free, let your hearts come forth. You loathe me, and you want me dead. When I've gone to His home, when I've perished, then perhaps you'll weep for me, you'll grieve for me, O friend. I go, I'm off to His home.

— Romances de los señores de Nueva España, fol. 26v–27, translated from Classical Nahuatl by John Bierhorst (2009). (Note: This poem, with a few differences, also appears in the Cantares Mexicanos. Bierhorst believes that the poem's singer might not be the ruler of Tepechpan, but rather a 14th-century ruler of Tlatelolco who coincidentally shared his name, despite the Romances glossator and other sources claiming otherwise. Rather strangely, the version of this poem written in the Cantares does not mention Nezahualcoyotl (who is referred to as Yoyontzin in the Romances).)

According to Diel (2008), Cuacuauhtzin appears to have been aware of Nezahualcoyotl's treachery by declaring "You loathe me, and you want me dead," yet, as his duty and obligation as a vassal, he still chose to go to battle knowing he would not survive, declaring "When I've gone to His home, when I've perished, then perhaps you'll weep for me" and "I go, I'm off to His home."

Cuacuauhtzin ended up being killed in the battle as had been planned; the Tira de Tepechpan records that his death occurred in the year 3 Reed, 1443. Sometime after, Nezahualcoyotl's wedding with Azcalxochitzin took place, in a ceremony where the lords of Tenochtitlan and Tlacopan, Moctezuma I and Totoquihuaztli I, were present along with many other lords. The plot to assassinate Cuacuauhtzin was kept in complete secrecy, only known by Nezahualcoyotl's closest family members.

Miguel León-Portilla found a song attributed to Nezahualcoyotl in which he seemingly expresses guilt and regret for his actions that led to Cuacuauhtzin's death with the following line:

Nitlayocoyay nicnotlamatiya çã nitepiltzin nineçahualcoyotl huiya xochitica yeehuã cuicatica niquimilnamiqui tepilhuão a yn oyaque yehua teçoçomoctzino yehuã qua'quauhtzin a ohuaya ohuaya

I suffer and grieve, I, Prince Nezahualcoyotl. With flowers, with songs, I recall the departed Princes Tezozomoc and Cuacuauhtzin.

— Cantares Mexicanos, fol. 25, translated by John Bierhorst (1985).

==== Consequences: backlash in Tepechpan ====
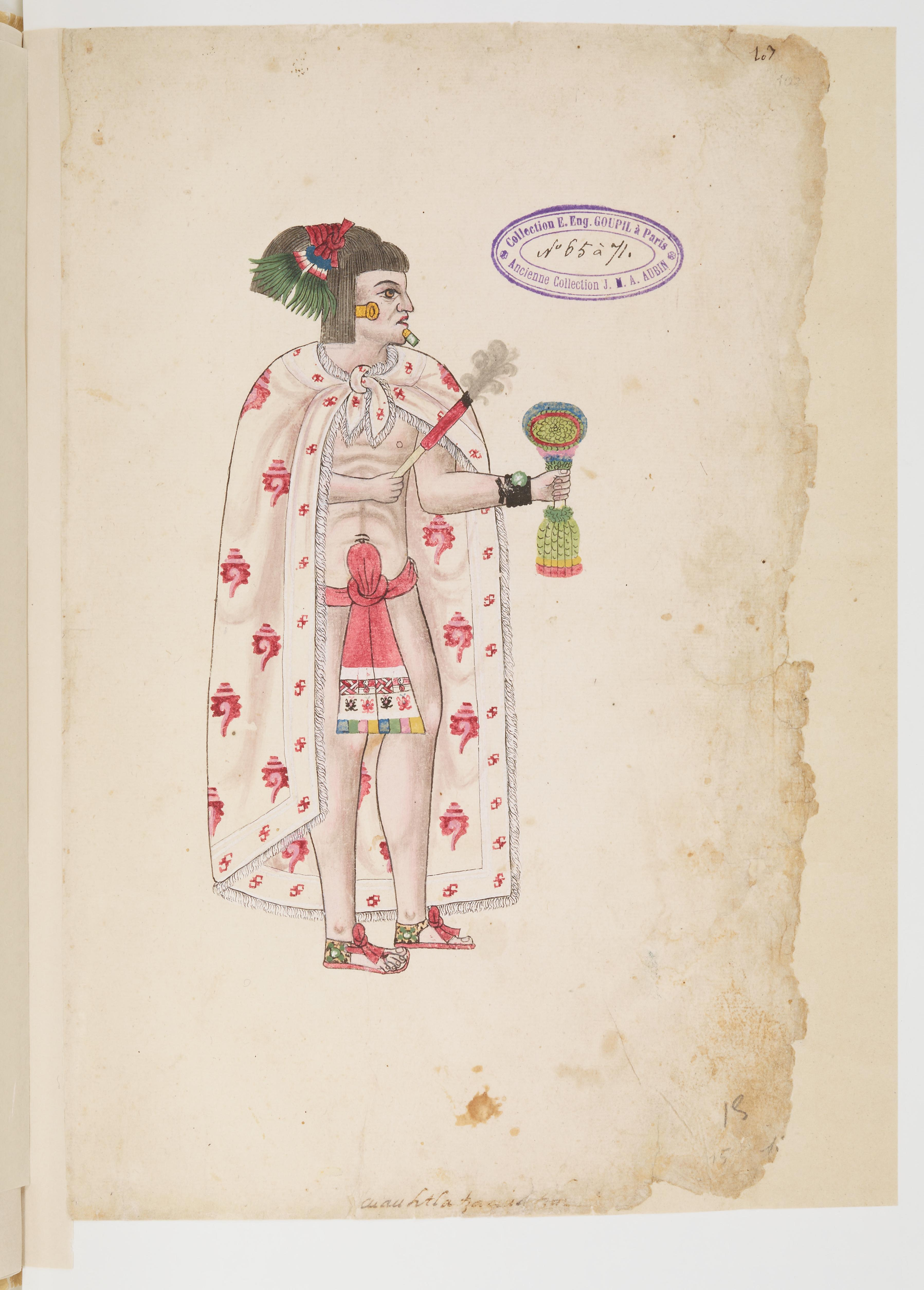
Cuauhtlatzacuilotzin, one of Nezahualcoyotl's sons, ruler of Chiauhtla and historian. Fernando de Alva Ixtlilxóchitl described him as one of Nezahualcoyotl's most important biographers, citing his now-lost annals in his History of the Chichimec people. Illustration from the Codex Ixtlilxochitl.

Cuacuauhtzin's assassination may have been the reason the inhabitants of Tepechpan disassociated themselves from Texcoco, in spite of being under their domain. The painters of the Tira de Tepechpan, which records the history of the city, avoided mentioning Texcoco in their record (it is only mentioned in alphabetic annotations added later), and instead, the painters portrayed Tepechpan as a principal ally of Tenochtitlan throughout the manuscript, ignoring Texcoco's role in Tepechpan's history or during the Tepanec War. In fact, Cuacuauhtzin's decision to marry a Mexica noblewoman, instead of a descendant of Texcoco's royalty, may have been an indication of his intention to sever ties with Texcoco, similarly to how Ixtlilxochitl I (Nezahualcoyotl's father) refused to marry Tezozomoc's daughter in order to sever all ties with the Tepanecs. In this context, the killing of Cuacuauhtzin may have been Nezahualcoyotl's retribution for his disloyalty—rather than the result of "love and desire"—in an act reminiscent of the assassination of Ixtlilxochitl I. Supporting this theory, in the Relación geográfica of Tepechpan, it is written that the city "is in the province of Texcoco, and it was an independent town until Nezahualcoyotzin, lord of Texcoco, tyrannized over it and made it a subject of Texcoco." The same document later states that Tenochtitlan unsuccessfully attempted to subjegate the city, and through marriage they became allies.

As early as the 17th century, Juan de Torquemada had already found that the story of Azcalxochitzin's marriage bears striking similarities to the biblical story of King David's betrayal of his loyal subject Uriah the Hittite, who was killed in battle so that David could marry his widow Bathsheba. Scholars have argued that chroniclers such as Alva Ixtlilxóchitl may have used this story to enhance the similarities between David and Nezahualcoyotl "in an attempt to make Texcoco appear to be a true place of the Christian faith." Nevertheless, Alva Ixtlilxóchitl, who was a Christian, believed that Nezahualcoyotl's treachery may have provoked the wrath of God, as in the year 1450, powerful snow storms caused destruction and disease which killed a large number of people, especially affecting the elderly; this was followed by a famine which lasted over three years and a great solar eclipse, which was visible on September 29, 1456. (Note: Alva Ixtlilxóchitl claimed that the eclipse occurred in early 1454. However, according to modern astronomical data, no annular or total solar eclipse took place at that time. Another annular solar eclipse occurred in April 1456, but it was not visible in Mesoamerica.)

== Descendants ==
=== 16th and 17th centuries ===
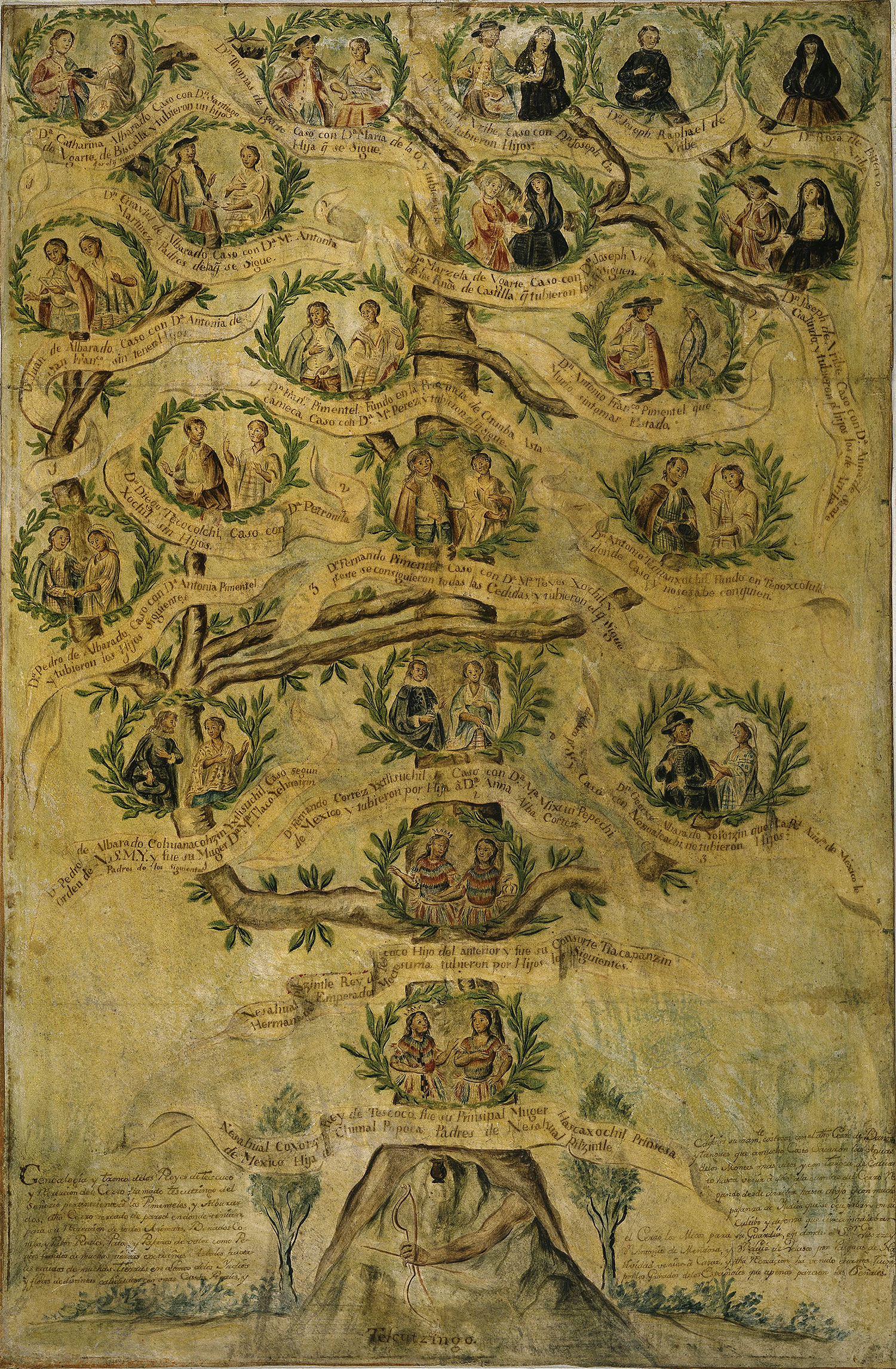
Family tree of the lords of Texcoco, painted between 1710 and 1720. Nezahualcoyotl appears at the bottom, his son Nezahualpilli appears above him, both wearing European crowns. This work is located at the Ethnological Museum of Berlin.

==== Pre-conquest descendants ====
After his death in 1472, Nezahualcoyotl was succeeded by his son Nezahualpilli, who ruled until his death in 1515. He obtained a similar reputation as his father as an enlightened poet and skilled administrator. Reports on Nezahualpilli's family, however, are often contradicting, but it is generally agreed that he had a large number of children (145 by some accounts) and that his successors were sons of Mexica noblewomen. A civil war in Acolhuacan (the region ruled by Texcoco) erupted following Nezahualpilli's death, as his sons fought over the throne. Ixtlilxochitl II challenged the election of Cacamatzin, nephew of Emperor Moctezuma II of Tenochtitilan—who supported by their brother Coanacoch—as his successor. After a series of combats, the three brothers agreed to let Cacamatzin rule Texcoco while Ixtlilxochitl received tribute the territories he occupied, which were the northern half of Acolhuacan, governed from the city of Otompan. Additionally, Coanacoch would rule the south of the region.

In 1519, Spanish soldiers led by conquistador Hernán Cortés arrived in the region. Using indigenous allies gathered by exploiting local politics and rivalries, Cortés soon imprisoned Emperor Moctezuma in his own palace and eventually attacked Tenochtitlan. Moctezuma's arrest infuriated Cacamatzin, who tried to attack the Spanish, but he was also imprisoned. On Moctezuma's advice, Cortés installed Nezahualpilli's son Cuicuitzcatl as ruler of Texcoco, but he was rejected as illegitimate, and the lords of Acolhuacan elected the anti-Spanish Coanacoch to rule. Over the course of the conquest, Cacamatzin and Cuicuitzcatl were killed, and Coanacoch fled to Tenochtitlan, where he fought alongside Cuauhtémoc, the last Mexica monarch. In Coanacoch's absence, Cortés appointed another of Nezahualpilli's sons to rule in his place. This ruler, who became a key Spanish ally, was baptized as Fernando Cortés Tecocoltzin (named after the conquistador, who was his baptismal sponsor).

==== Post-conquest descendants ====
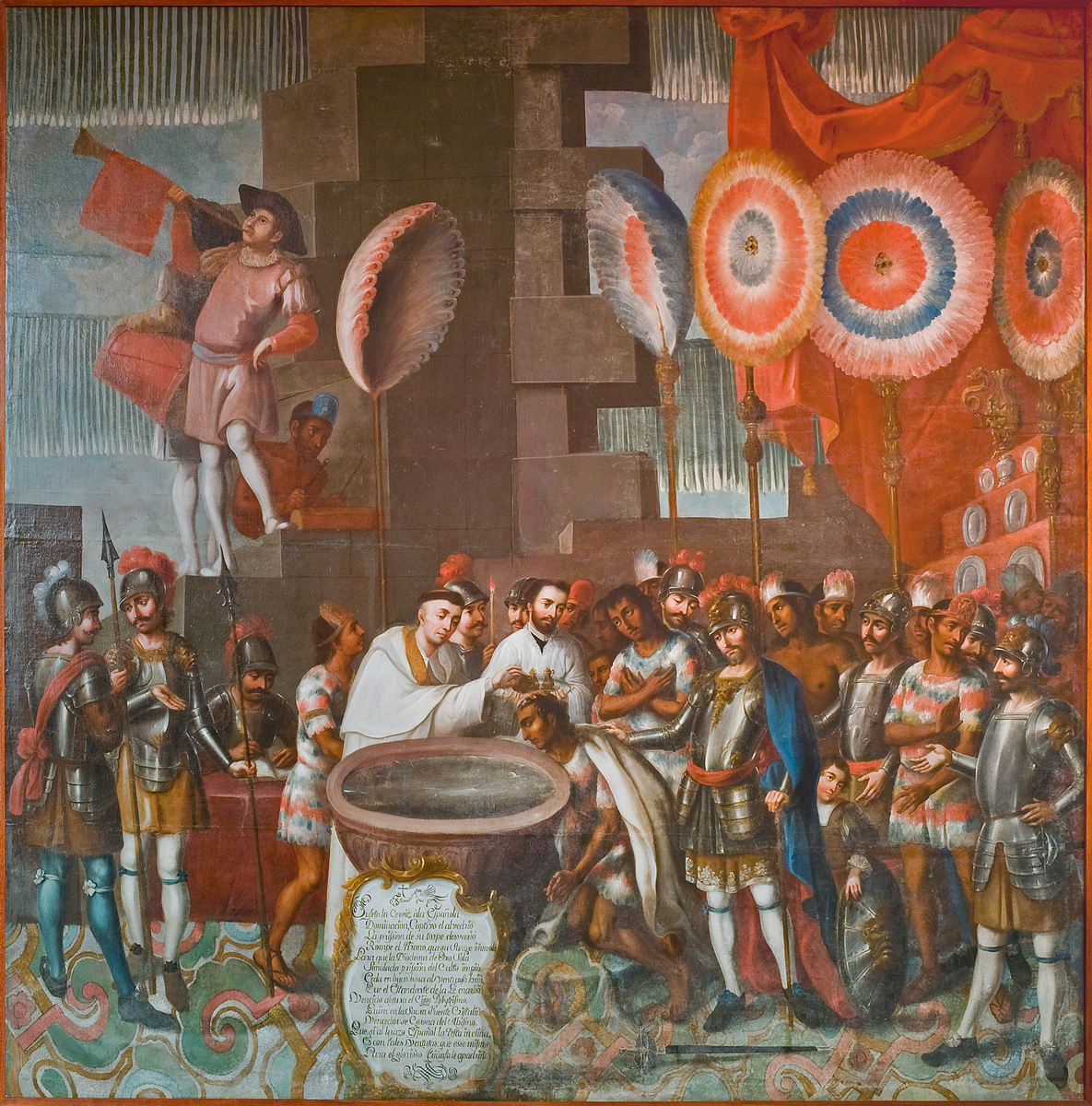
Baptism of Ixtlilxochitl II, painted by José Vivar y Valderrama, c. 1752. Museo Nacional de Historia, Mexico City.

On August 13, 1521, the Spanish conquest of Mexico was fulfilled after Cuauhtémoc finally surrendered. Both him and Coanacoch were allowed to keep their position as a rulers. Coanacoch was baptized under the name of Pedro de Alvarado Coanacochtzin, named after conquistador Pedro de Alvarado. Though he was allowed to continue holding the position of tlatoani (king), he was held captive by Cortés, and Ixtlilxochitl still controlled the northern part of Acolhuacan. In 1525, under the suspicion of forming a conspiracy to kill Cortés during his expedition to Honduras, Coanacoch was executed along with Cuauhtémoc and the ruler of Tlacopan. Ixtlilxochitl II, who was baptized as Don Fernando Cortés Ixtlilxóchitl, became the uncontested ruler of Texcoco, with Cortés's blessing, until his death in 1531.

Almost immediately after the Spanish conquest, the Spanish authorities gave the title of "governors" (gobernadores) or caciques to the tlatoque who succeeded their pre-conquest ancestors in the rulership of the local polities, (Note: Gobernador is a term of Spanish origin, whereas cacique is of Arawak origin, roughly meaning "chief." These titles, while often occupied by the same person in the early 16th century, were not synonymous and could be occupied by different people. As an example, Don Pedro Tetlahuehuetzquititzin was cacique of Texcoco between 1534 and 1539, but the title of governor belonged to a man named Don Francisco in 1537, and to another named Don Lorenzo de Luna in 1539. The title of governor meant leading the municipal council (cabildo) of a region, whose members were known as regidores. These regidores were often high-ranking pre-Hispanic nobles and their descendants.) and, through decrees, their rights to possess certain plots of land, possess and use certain weapons, etc., were confirmed. However, this cacicazgo system was built in a confusing and non-solid manner due to the Spanish lack of understanding of indigenous government systems, and over the course of the decades following the second half of the 16th century, the indigenous nobility gradually lost its prestige and some of its members sold their land. By the early 19th century, as Alexander von Humboldt observed, a cacique was almost indistinguishable from any indigenous person belonging to the tributary class, describing them as "presenting the same lack of manners and the same lack of civilization as the common people."

Ixtlilxochitl's daughter, Doña Ana Cortés Ixtlilxóchitl, married the cacique of Teotihuacan, Don Francisco Verdugo Quetzalmamalitzin Huetzin. They were the great-grandparents of Fernando de Alva Ixtlilxóchitl, a historian who dedicated much of his life, in the 17th century, to documenting the pre-Hispanic history of Texcoco, making his work the most extensive source of information on the subject, in spite of his controversial writings regarding his ancestors. Another historian, Juan Bautista Pomar, was also a descendant of Nezahualcoyotl, but he was not considered eligible for succession for being son of Nezahualpilli's illegitimate daughter Doña María Ixtlilxóchitl, who was married to the Spanish Antonio de Pomar. Doña María Ixtlilxóchitl was the daughter of one of Nezahualpilli's slaves. This historian was notable for his Relación de Tezcoco, from 1582, one of the works he sent to King Philip II of Spain.

The descendants of Ixtlilxochitl and Coanacoch would enter legal disputes decades after they died. Much like their forefathers, the disputes were over claims to patrimony. Such was the case of a lawsuit filed in 1576 by Doña Francisca Verdugo, Ixtlilxochitl's granddaughter, and her Spanish husband Juan Grande, against her second cousin Don Francisco Pimentel, son of Hernando Pimentel Nezahualcoyotzin, cacique and governor of Texcoco, himself son of Coanacoch. While Don Francisco's claim for the cacicazgo of Texcoco was disputed, he did later serve as governor of the city.

After the 16th century, the line of Nezahualcoyotl's descendants becomes less clear. In 1627, Doña Juana Pimentel was cacica of Texcoco and sold a plot of land to her son-in-law Don Juan Pimentel, who lived in Mexico City. She wrote that she inherited the land from her father Don Diego, and described herself as a great-great-granddaughter of Nezahualcoyotl, but her exact connection with her ancestors is not entirely clear. In 1795, the caciques of Texcoco, Pablo José Pimentel and Pablo Marcial Pimentel, were described as illiterate in a legal document, agreeing with Humboldt's statement that by this time the indigenous nobility had lost its high status in society.

=== Later descendants ===
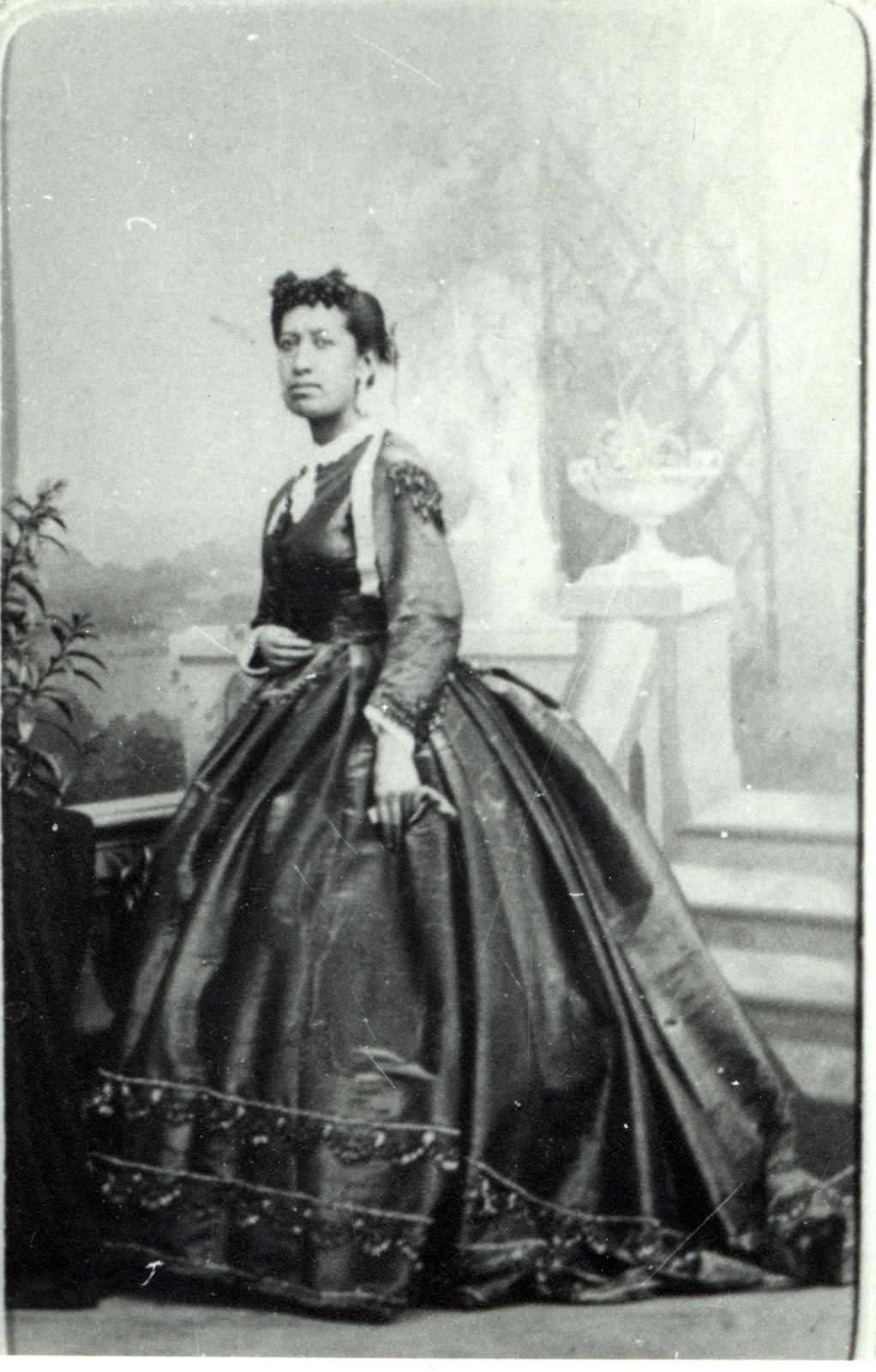
Josefa Varela y Rodríguez, maid of honour of Empress Charlotte of Mexico. She claimed to be a direct descendant of Nezahualcoyotl. This photograph was taken by Julio Valleto, c. 1866.

Up to the 19th century in Mexico, the ancient indigenous nobility continued to exist and claim their rights to possess certain territories that belonged to their ancestors, albeit the members of this late indigenous nobility often did not possess the fortune or the land that their ancestors possessed, due to the gradual loss of prestige and land that took place after the 16th century.

As late as 1855, two descendants of Nezahualcoyotl, Doña Guadalupe Carrillo Pimentel and Doña María Antonia Güemes Pimentel, requested a notary public to copy and certify various historical documents they possessed to obtain the territories that belonged to the monarch and his son Nezahualpilli. These two ladies were members of the Pimentel family, which possessed the cacicazgo of Texcoco. The first ruler of Texcoco under this family name was Don Antonio Pimentel Tlahueliltzin (or Tlahuelitlotzin), son of Nezahualpilli, and therefore grandson of Nezahualcoyotl. He ruled until he died of illness during an epidemic which killed the majority of Texcoco's indigenous population in 1545—leaving only 18,000 survivors out of the 100,000 inhabitants the city possessed in 1519—, and was succeeded by his nephew Hernando Velásquez, also known as Hernando Pimentel Nezahualcoyotzin, who was son of Coanacochtli (ruler of Texcoco executed in 1525 by conquistador Hernán Cortés) and would rule for nearly 20 years. Before Antonio Pimentel became ruler, his brother Carlos Ometochtzin had ruled, but notably he was publicly executed by the Inquisition at the great plaza of Mexico City in 1539.

Another notable person who claimed to be a descendant of Nezahualcoyotl was Josefa Varela y Rodríguez, a woman from Texcoco, described as dark-skinned, "indigenous of pure blood" (de pura raza indígena), who became the only indigenous woman to become part of the imperial entourage of Empress Charlotte of Mexico in the 1860s (during the Second Mexican Empire), serving as her maid of honour. (Note: She was also one of the youngest women in such a position, described as being about 22 years old in 1866. She was not the only indigenous person at the service of the monarchs during this period. Individuals such as Tomás Mejía, a general close to Emperor Maximilian of Mexico, and Faustino Chimalpopoca Galicia, the Emperor's interpreter, were indigenous as well.) She was daughter of the otherwise unknown Santiago Varela, and despite her position in the empire, she was born in poverty. Historians have not confirmed her claim of being a descendant of the Poet King, but it is plausible that her claim was truthful. As early as the 18th century, the majority of members of the indigenous nobility were already described as "impoverished." Following the fall of the empire in 1867, she continued claiming to be a descendant of Nezahualcoyotl up to the year 1905 at the very least.

== Legacy ==
=== Remembrance in the 15th and 16th centuries ===
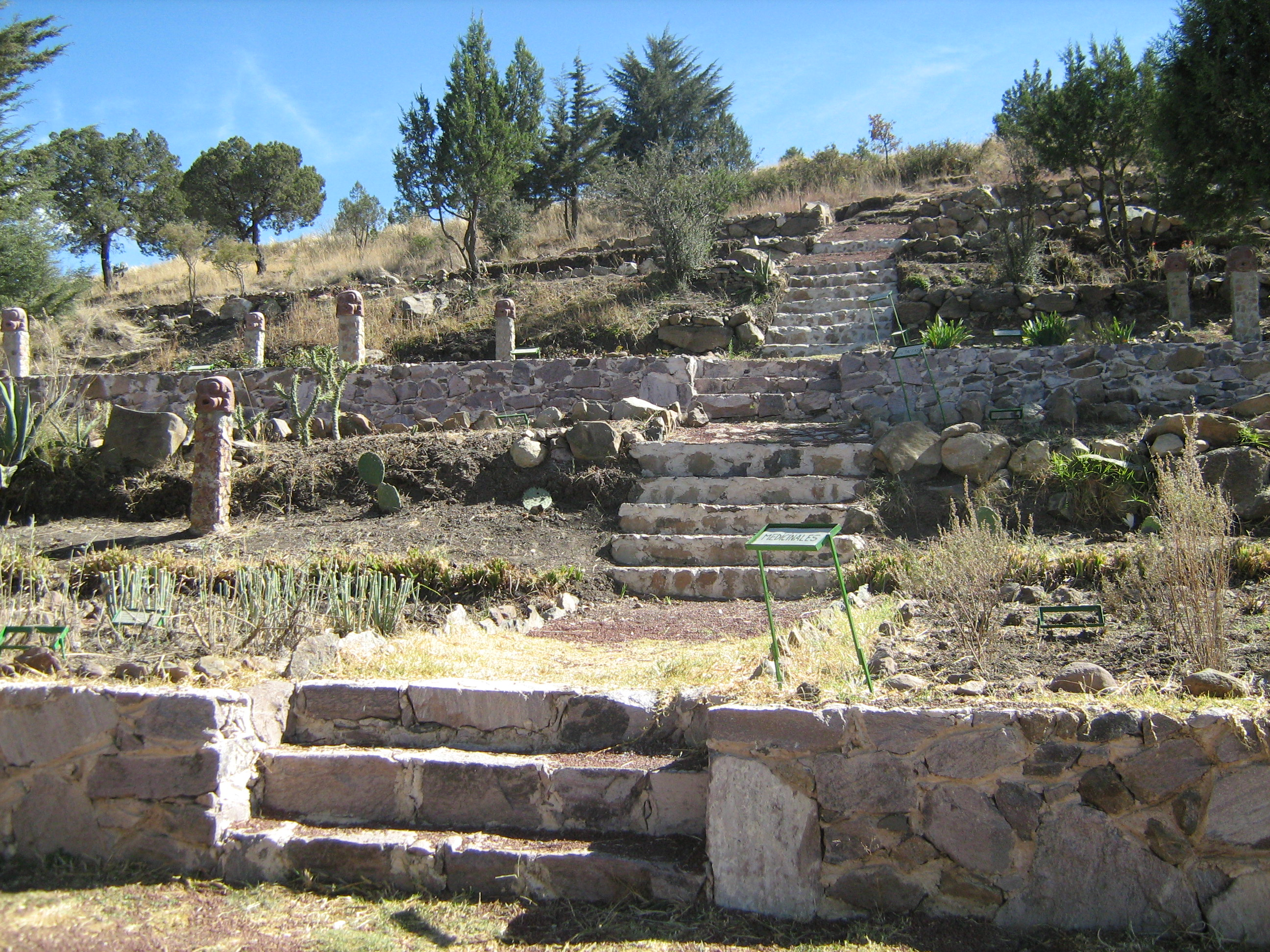
Sculptures at Texcotzingo. A portrait of Nezahualcoyotl used to be located at the hil's summit, but it was destroyed, along with other sculptures, in the 16th century.

Nezahualcoyotl's reputation as a hero turned him into a highly respected figure by the indigenous population throughout the course of the 15th and 16th centuries, even after the Spanish conquest in 1521. Judging from 16th-century documents, it would seem that colonial religious authorities were confused about Nezahualcoyotl and mistook historical remembrance for idolatry, due to how the indigenous people praised him for his deeds decades after his death:

A una legua del pueblo [Tepetlaoztoc] se vee oy con estraña Magestad el puesto que tenia el demonio tiranizado para su honra. Es un cerro que se llama Tezcuçingo, donde el gran poder de los Reyes de Tezcu-co se avia singularizado en servicio del demonio. En lo mas alto deste cerro estaba el famoso ídolo que llamavan Zaualcoittl [Nezahualcóyotl] ... Esta figura representava a un Indio grande ayunador, a quien tuvieron por santo

[A league from the town (Tepetlaoztoc), one can now see with strange majesty the spot where the tyrannical demon was honoured. It's a hill called Tezcuçingo, where the great power of the Kings of Tezcuco was singularly devoted to the service of the demon. At this hill's summit was the famous idol they called Zaualcoittl (Nezahualcoyotl) ... This figure represented a great Indian who practiced fasting, whom they held as a saint]

— Agustín Dávila Padilla, Historia de la Fundación y Discurso de la Provincia de Santiago de México, de la orden de predicadores (1596), p. 620.

The quote above refers to a portrait of Nezahualcoyotl created under his supervision which was located at the summit of the hill of Texcotzingo. Like various other sculptures, it was destroyed by Bishop Juan de Zumárraga on July 7, 1539, "in a manner such that they would no longer be remembered," following reports of "idolatrous acts" at the hill. Fernando de Alva Ixtlilxóchitl, writing nearly 70 years after this incident, described the destroyed portrait as a sculpted rock which illustrated the most notable of Nezahualcoyotl's deeds, as well as his supposed coat of arms at the centre, of which he offered a detailed description. (Note: Alva Ixtlilxóchitl's description: "at the first pond of water, there was a sculpted rock, the circumference of which [bore] the years from the birth of King Nezahualcoyotl to the present age, and outside ... there were also carved the most memorable things that he did; and on the inside of the circle his coat of arms was [composed of] a house burning in flames and ruined, another [part] was very emblazoned with buildings, and between the two [there was] a deer’s foot with a very precious stone in it, and coming from the foot [were] some crests made of precious feathers; and likewise a doe [or hind], and in it an arm grasping a bow with some arrows; and as an armed man with his helmet and earflaps, breastplate, and two jaguars on the sides from whose mouth came water and fire; and on the border [were] twelve heads of kings and gentlemen, and other things".) As Hajovsky (2015) observes, Alva Ixtlilxóchitl attempts to use heraldry to portray indigenous royalty as equivalent to Spanish royalty.

Still in the 1570s, Nezahualcoyotl's belongings, such as "his statue, his shield, banners, trumpets, flutes, weapons" and more which he used during warfare and festivals, were still "preserved with great religious respect" by the people of Texcoco as relics.

=== Late colonial period and 19th century ===
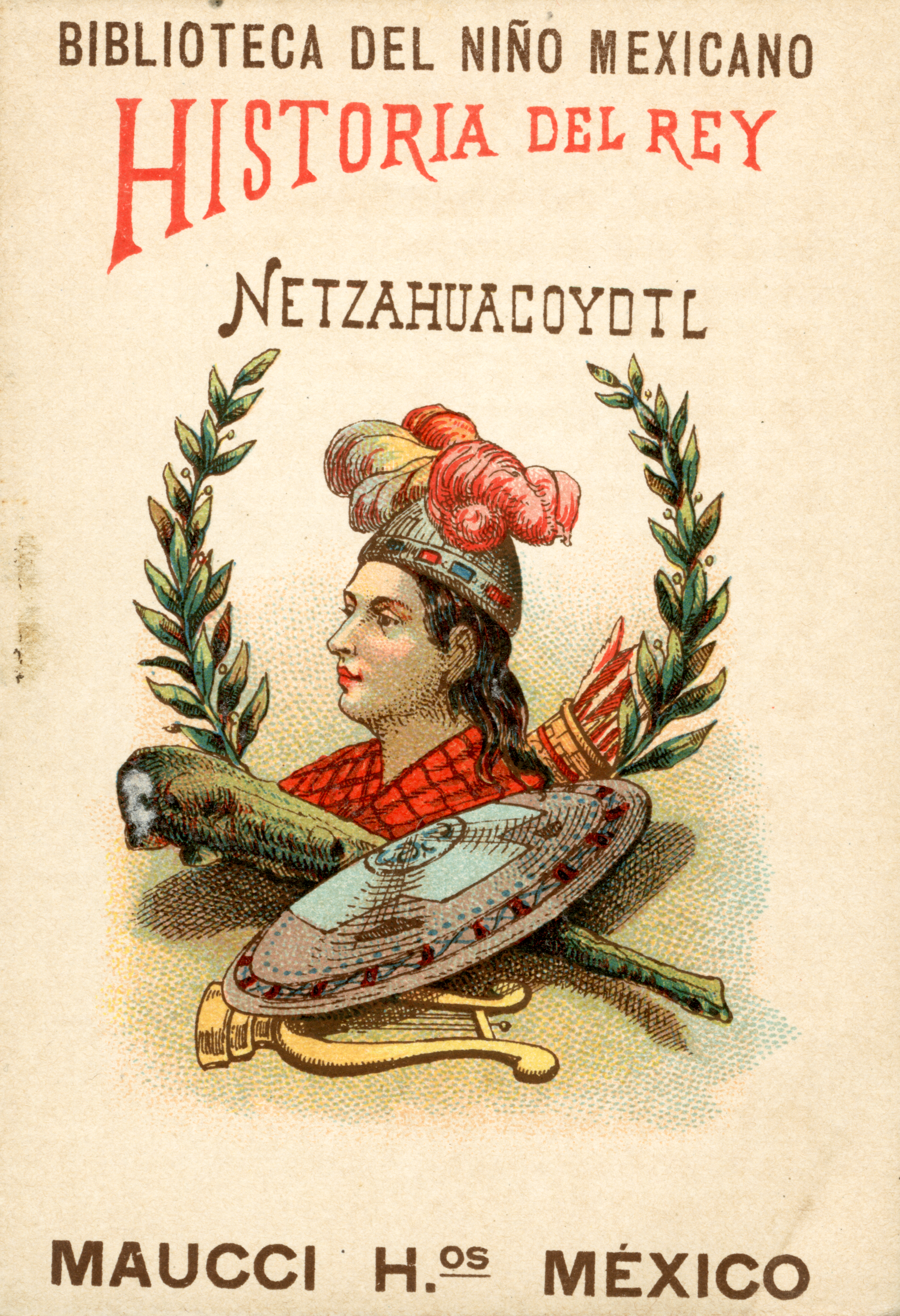
Cover illustration, designed by José Guadalupe Posada, of the Historia del rey Netzahuacoyotl [sic], published by Heriberto Frías in 1900.

As Bierhorst (1985) observes, the name of Nezahualcoyotl had become virtually synonymous with old Nahuatl poetry by the 18th century in Mexico, to the point that he became a "necessary" topic of discussion for writers on Mexican antiquities. His fame had reached the extent that apparent forgeries appeared, as was the infamous case of a poem printed in 1778 which includes phrases such as "All the round world is but a sepulchre." This poem, despite being a forgery based on an Otomi folk poem, was picked up by historians such as William H. Prescott in the 19th century.

Throughout the 19th century, following Mexico's independence from Spain, Mexican historians made a great effort to counteract Eurocentric misconceptions about the indigenous peoples of the Americas, particularly the notion that the pre-Hispanic civilisations of Mexico were "barbaric" cultures "without history." Nezahualcoyotl, thus, became pictured as the epitome of "high culture and civilisation" in 19th-century nationalist historiography, and also became used as a counterbalance against the "more violent and idolatrous practices of the Mexicas," giving a more positive and sophisticated image to the indigenous peoples. Late in this century, during the Porfiriato, Heriberto Frías wrote and published a series of brief tales about Mexico's history, including ancient legends and the deeds of several pre-Hispanic individuals and heroes, with the intention to foster patriotism among the youth. One such tale was a fanciful and romantic biography of Nezahualcoyotl.

Religion was also involved in the process of turning Nezahualcoyotl into the epitome of civilisation. Nezahualcoyotl's supposed conversion to monotheism became a source of interest among Christian writers, such as Prescott, and various artists who painted works inspired by this legend. The legend of Nezahualcoyotl's conversion, along with Christian notions of the god Quetzalcoatl as a saint-like figure, "sought to legitimise the humanity of indígenas and their parity with Europeans," as Martínez Rodríguez (2004) writes, by picturing the indigenous peoples as "the agents of their own conversion" to Christianity.

In 1868, in a post-war environment following years of foreign invasion and civil war, a group of young Mexican students, many of them teenagers, formed the Sociedad Nezahualcóyotl, under the leadership of Manuel Acuña, initially as a poetic project which had the objective of creating a unique form of literature, reforming the theatre and promoting literary publications. The society was supported by Ignacio Manuel Altamirano, a distinguished and influential writer, who described its members as "young, hard-working and enthusiastic students who do not give up and who will eventually reach the heights of fame." The first works by the members of this literary society were published in 1869 in a newspaper publication, before the foundation of the society's magazine, El Anáhuac. Though some of the society's members unfortunately died young, including Acuña, who committed suicide, others managed to obtain successful careers as diplomats or politicians, such as Juan de Dios Peza, who became a member of the Mexican legation in Spain.

=== Contemporary Mexico and Latin America ===
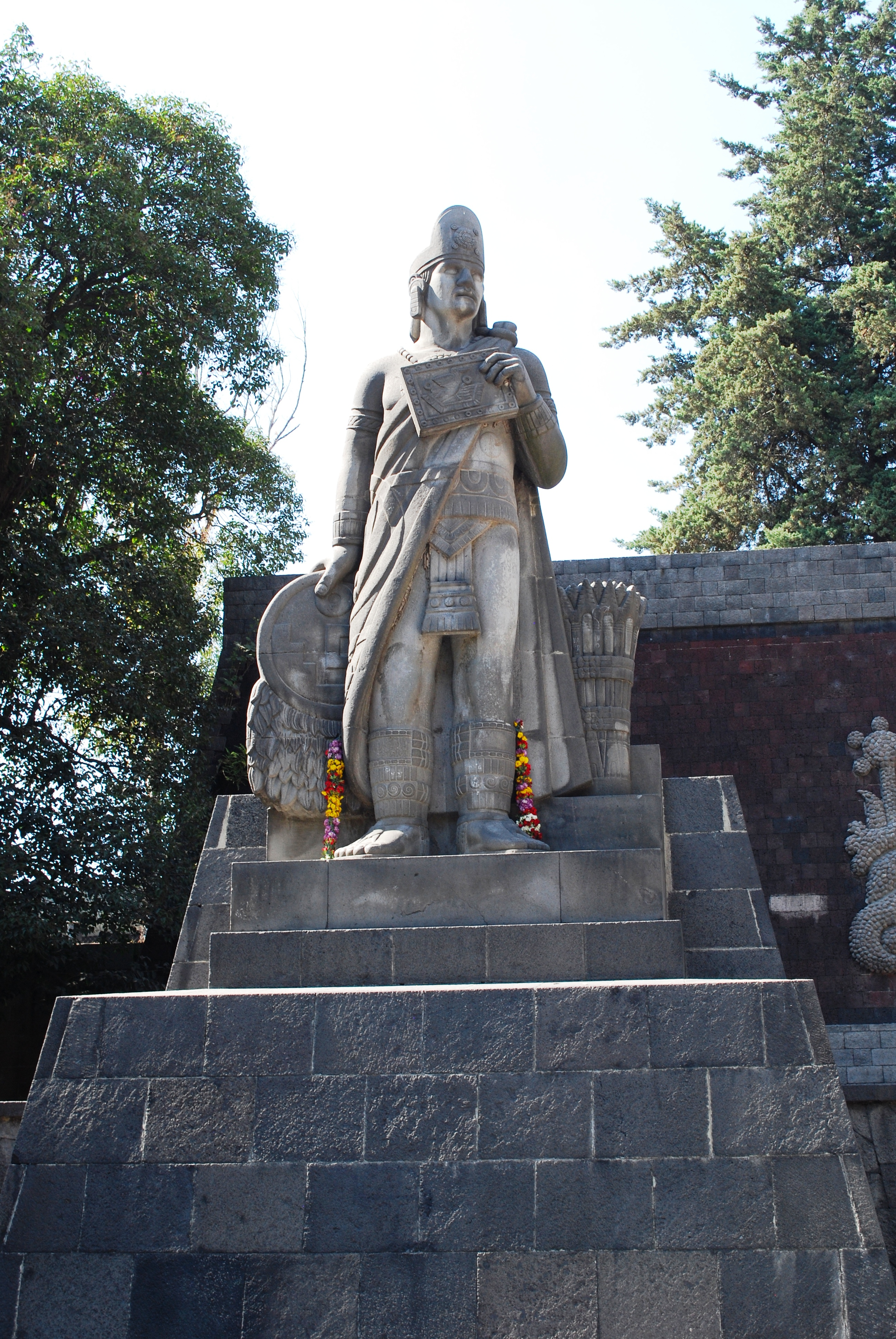
Statue of Nezahualcoyotl, part of the monumental fountain dedicated to him at Chapultepec, built by Luis Ortiz Monasterio in 1956.

Centuries after his death, Nezahualcoyotl continues to be an influential figure in modern Mexican education and philosophy. His poems are taught to Mexican children as part of their primary education, as a way of introducing Spanish-speaking children to indigenous languages and cultures, and to connect them with the country's pre-Hispanic past. Additionally, the Nezahualcóyotl Award (Premio Nezahualcóyotl) was created in 1993 as an award ceremony celebrating indigenous literature in Mexico with the purpose of "stimulating the literary creativity of the indigenous writers of Mexico"; it has been regarded as "the most prestigious literary award in Mexico and Latin America for indigenous writers." In 1976, the Sala Nezahualcóyotl concert hall was inaugurated in Mexico City, often regarded as one of the greatest concert halls in the continent due to its "architectural beauty and acoustical engineering." Because of the beautiful quality of the poems historically attributed to him, he is typically referred to as "the Poet-King" (Rey Poeta) in Mexican literature.

His great-grandson Juan Bautista Pomar is credited with the compilation of a collection of Nahuatl poems, Romances de los señores de Nueva España, and with a chronicle of the history of the Aztecs. The freshwater fish Xiphophorus nezahualcoyotl is named after Nezahualcoyotl. Nezahualcoyotl appears on the former 100 peso banknote of Mexico.

The municipality of Nezahualcóyotl, State of Mexico, which began to be populated in the mid-1940s by people from several states and was officially declared as a municipality on April 20, 1963, is named after the monarch. According to the INEGI, the municipality has a population of over 1 million people as of 2020.

Elsewhere in Latin America, numerous poets have been inspired by the works attributed to Nezahualcoyotl and their philosophy. Ernesto Cardenal, a famous poet from Nicaragua, incorporated indigenous traditions in his work and, according to Lee (2003), "perpetuates the image of Nezahualcoyotl as a peaceful and civilized poet-king opposed to the Mexicas" in his work entitled Homenaje a los indios americanos (1972) and its expanded version, Los ovnis de oro (1992). In 1949, American scholar and novelist Frances Gillmor published her biography of Nezahualcoyotl, Flute of the Smoking Mirror, the culmination of over ten years of her research on the Aztecs in Mexico. She began her research after visiting Mexico City in 1937 to interview the renowned artist Diego Rivera (who would later depict Nezahualcoyotl as the "apparent inventor of a flying machine" in his painting Pan American Unity, revealed in 1940). Gillmor incorporated vivid details of Aztec daily life, culture, religion and politics in her work, and it "consciously reflects Nahuatl literary style and choice of metaphor, and represents a literary as well as a scholarly contribution." She continued studying the Aztecs in Mexico in the 1950s at the National School of Anthropology and History and at the National Autonomous University of Mexico.

As writer Ilan Stavans states, Nezahualcoyotl's story "has become an essential component in the construction of modern Mexican identity," despite the mythical or even fictional elements of his biographies. On his personal experience, Stavans writes that "When I was growing up in the Mexico of the 1960s (in my childhood, I spent time in Texcoco), Nezahualcóyotl was seen as an antidote to European colonialism, since apparently the poet-king foresaw the collapse of the Aztec empire, articulating it to the Texcocan people."

== Family tree ==
Nezahualcoyotl's ancestry and its relationship with the Mexica and Tepanec dynasties, according to the Codex Xolotl

Acolnahuacatzin, tlatoani of Tlacopan	Tzihuacxochitzin
Huitzilihuitl, tlatoani of Mexico-Tenochtitlan	Tetzihuatzin (Note: Fray Juan de Torquemada claims that Huitzilihuitl married Ayauhcihuatl, daughter of Tezozomoc, king of Azcapotzalco, whose son was named Acolnahuacatl. Torquemada makes no mention of Tetzihuatzin in his work. He claims Huitzilihuitl had a second wife, but she was named Miahuaxochitl, who was the daughter of the king of Cuauhnahuac, Tezcacohuatzin. Diego Durán also claims Ayauhcihuatl was Huitzilihuitl's wife.)	Totoquihuaztli I, tlatoani of Tlacopan, founder of the Aztec Empire	Quaquauhpitzahuac, tlatoani of Mexico-Tlatelolco	Coaxochitl
Ixtlilxochitl I, tlatoani of Texcoco	Matlalcihuatzin (Note: The Codex Xolotl illustrates that Huitzilihuitl and Tetzihuatzin had eight children in total. The children of lesser importance are omitted in this chart.)	Itzcoatl, (Note: Diego Durán contradics the Codex Xolotl by claiming that Itzcoatl was the illegitimate son of Acamapichtli (father and predecessor of Huitzilihuitl), born to a female slave from Azcapotzalco, making him Chimalpopoca's uncle and Huitzilihuitl's half-brother. However, Durán does claim that Nezahualcoyotl's mother was Itzcoatl's sister.) tlatoani of Mexico-Tenochtitlan, founder of the Aztec Empire	Chimalpopoca, (Note: Durán again contradicts the Codex Xolotl; he claimed that Chimalpopoca was the son of Huitzilihuitl's wife Ayauhcihuatl, daughter of the Azcapotzalco king Tezozomoc. This statement is contradicted by Juan de Torquemada, who claimed Chimalpopoca was Huitzilihuitl's brother, son of king Acamapichtli of Tenochtitlan and his second wife Tezcatlamiahuatl.) tlatoani of Mexico-Tenochtitlan	Matlalatzin (Note: The Codex Xolotl illustrates that Matlalatzin and Tlacateotl had a brother named Amantzin, who is omitted in this chart.)	Tlacateotl, tlatoani of Mexico-Tlatelolco
Nezahualcoyotl, tlatoani of Texcoco, founder of the Aztec Empire	Tozquentzin	Moctezuma I, (Note: The Codex Xolotl illustrates that Chimalpopoca and Matlalatzin had seven children in total. The children of lesser importance are omitted in this chart. Fernando de Alva Ixtlilxóchitl only writes the names of two of these children, Moctezuma and Quatlecoatzin. Torquemada contradicts Ixtlilxóchitl and the codex by claiming that Moctezuma was the son of Huitzilihuitl and Miahuaxochitl.) tlatoani of Mexico-Tenochtitlan

Legend

XXX	Article subject	XXX	Acolhua kings	XXX	Mexica kings	XXX	Tepanec kings

== See also ==
- Texcoco (altepetl)
- History of the Aztecs
- Aztec Empire
- Mexican literature
- Nahuatl
- Ixtlilxochitl I
- Nezahualpilli
- Cuacuauhtzin
- Aztec mythology

== Works cited ==
=== Primary sources ===
- Alva Ixtlilxóchitl, Fernando de (1891). Chavero, Alfredo (ed.). Obras históricas (in Spanish). Vol. 1. Mexico: Oficina Tip. de la Secretaría de Fomento.
- Alva Ixtlilxóchitl, Fernando de (2021). Historia de la nación chichimeca (in Spanish). Barcelona: Red ediciones S.L. ISBN 978-84-9897-749-3.
  - —— (2019). History of the Chichimeca Nation: Don Fernando de Alva Ixtlilxochitl's Seventeenth-Century Chronicle of Ancient Mexico. Translated by Brian, Amber; Benton, Bradley; Villella, Peter B.; García Loaeza, Pablo. Norman: University of Oklahoma Press. ISBN 978-0-8061-6398-7.
- Bierhorst, John (1992). History and Mythology of the Aztecs: the Codex Chimalpopoca. Tucson: University of Arizona Press. ISBN 0-8165-1886-6.
- Boturini Benaducci, Lorenzo (1826). Bustamante, Carlos María de (ed.). Tezcoco en los últimos tiempos de sus antiguos reyes (in Spanish). Mexico: Imprenta de Mariano Galván Rivera.
- Clavijero, Francisco Javier (1917). González Obregón, Luis (ed.). Historia antigua de México (in Spanish). Vol. 1. Translated by Mora, José Joaquín de. Mexico: Departamento Editorial de la Dirección General de las Bellas Artes.
- Durán, Diego (1964). The Aztecs: the History of the Indies of New Spain. Translated by Heyden, Doris; Horcasitas, Fernando. New York: Orion Press.
- Torquemada, Juan de (1975) [1615]. Monarquía indiana (in Spanish). Vol. 1 (3rd ed.). Universidad Nacional Autónoma de México, Instituto de Investigaciones Históricas.

=== Secondary sources ===
==== Books ====
- Benton, Bradley (2017). The Lords of Tetzcoco: The Transformation of Indigenous Rule in Postconquest Central Mexico. United Kingdom: Cambridge University Press. doi:10.1017/9781108115971. ISBN 9781108115971.
- Berdan, Frances F. (2014). Aztec Archaeology and Ethnohistory. Cambridge University Press. doi:10.1017/CBO9781139017046. ISBN 9781139017046.
- Bierhorst, John (1985). Cantares Mexicanos: Songs of the Aztecs. California: Stanford University Press. ISBN 0-8047-1182-8.
- Bierhorst, John (2009). Ballads of the Lords of New Spain. Austin: University of Texas Press. ISBN 978-0-292-71852-4.
- Castañeda de la Paz, María; Oudijk, Michel R. (2019). El Códice Mexicanus (in Spanish). Vol. 1. Mexico: Universidad Nacional Autónoma de México. ISBN 978-607-30-2569-0.
- Dibble, Charles E. (1980). Códice Xolotl (in Spanish) (2nd ed.). Mexico: Universidad Nacional Autónoma de México. ISBN 968-58-2655-2.
- Diel, Lori Boornazian (2008). The Tira de Tepechpan: Negotiating Place Under Aztec and Spanish Rule. Austin: University of Texas Press. ISBN 978-0-292-71831-9.
- Douglas, Eduardo de J. (2010). In the Palace of Nezahualcoyotl: Painting Manuscripts, Writing the Pre-Hispanic Past in Early Colonial Period Tetzcoco, Mexico. Austin: University of Texas Press. ISBN 978-0-292-72168-5.
- Hassig, Ross (1988). Aztec Warfare: Imperial Expansion and Political Control. Norman: University of Oklahoma Press. ISBN 0-8061-2121-1.
- León-Portilla, Miguel (1992). Fifteen Poets of the Aztec World. Norman: University of Oklahoma Press. ISBN 0-8061-2441-5.
- Martínez, José Luis (2003) [1972]. Nezahualcóyotl: vida y obra (in Spanish). Mexico: Fondo de Cultura Económica. ISBN 968-16-0509-8.
- Orozco y Berra, Manuel (1880). Historia antigua y de la conquista de México (in Spanish). Vol. 3. Mexico: Tipografía de Gonzalo A. Esteva.
- Prescott, William H. (1873). Kirk, John Foster (ed.). History of the conquest of Mexico. Vol. 1. Philadelphia: J. B. Lippincott & Co..
- Stresser-Péan, Guy (1995). El Códice de Xicotepec: Estudio e interpretación (PDF) (in Spanish). Puebla; Mexico, D.F.: Gobierno del Estado de Puebla, Centro Francés de Estudios Mexicanos y Centroamericanos, Fondo de Cultura Económica. ISBN 968-16-4761-0.

==== Book chapters ====
- Diel, Lori Boornazian (2014). "The Mapa Quinatzin and Texcoco's Ideal Subordinate Lords". In Lee, Jongsoo; Brokaw, Galen (eds.). Texcoco: Prehispanic and Colonial Perspectives. Boulder: University Press of Colorado. pp. 117–145. doi:10.5876/9781607322849.C005. ISBN 978-1-60732-284-9.
- Evans, Susan Toby (2010). "The Garden of the Aztec Philosopher-King". In O'Brien, Dan (ed.). Gardening Philosophy for Everyone. Chichester: Wiley-Blackwell. pp. 207–219. ISBN 978-1-4443-3021-2.
- Kibbee, Jo (1989). "Frances Gillmor". In Gacs, Ute; Khan, Aisha; McIntyre, Jerrie; Weinberg, Ruth (eds.). Women Anthropologists: Selected Biographies. University of Illinois Press. pp. 115–119. ISBN 0-252-06084-9.
- Peralta Ramírez, Valentín (2023). "Análisis, glosado y traducción del documento escrito en mexicano del título de propiedad de tierras, monte y agua del pueblo de Santa María Nativitas, escrito en el año de 1537". In Martínez Corripio, Israel; Rodríguez Cano, Laura; Peralta Ramírez, Valentín (eds.). Aspectos culturales entre nahuas, mixtecos, otomíes y mayas. Análisis de textos históricos y narraciones orales (in Spanish). Mexico: ENAH. Ediciones Navarra. pp. 25–104. ISBN 978-607-8789-88-7. Archived from the original on 17 May 2026.
- Rojas Rabiela, Teresa (2009). "El agua en la antigua Mesoamérica: usos y tecnología". In Rojas Rabiela, Teresa; Martínez Ruiz, José Luis; Murillo Licea, Daniel (eds.). Cultura hidráulica y simbolismo mesoamericano del agua en el México prehispánico (PDF) (in Spanish). Jiutepec, Morelos: Instituto Mexicano de Tecnología del Agua. ISBN 978-697-7563-06-8. Archived from the original (PDF) on 9 July 2026.

==== Journal articles ====
- Ávila, Diego (23 September 2019). "Las últimas murallas del imperio mexica que siguen en pie (y se pueden conocer)". Travesías (in Spanish).
- Battcock, Clementina; Zavala López, Jhonnatan Alejandro (2022). "Las disputas por las memorias de la conquista: la crónica de Fernando de Alva Ixtlilxóchitl". Memoria Americana (in Spanish). 30 (1): 46–66. doi:10.34096/mace.v30i1.10387. ISSN 1851-3751.
- Bautista, Virginia (30 December 2016). "Sala Nezahualcóyotl; es como un instrumento". Excélsior (in Spanish).
- García Chávez, Raúl Ernesto (2018). "El Albarradón de Ecatepec: estrategias de investigación y resultados, de un caso paradigmático de la arqueología de salvamento, en el área urbana de la Cuenca de México" [The "Albarradón de Ecatepec": investigation strategies and results of a paradigmatic case of rescue archaeology in the urban area of the Basin of Mexico]. Revista de Arqueología Histórica Argentina y Latinoamericana (in Spanish). 12 (3). Buenos Aires: Asociación de Arqueólogos Profesionales de la República Argentina: 903–933. doi:10.55695/rdahayl12.03.157. ISSN 2344-9918.
- Hicks, Frederic (1978). "Los calpixque de Nezahualcóyotl". Estudios de Cultura Náhuatl (in Spanish). 13: 129–152. ISSN 3061-8002.
- Hicks, Frederic (1982). "Tetzcoco in the early 16th century: the state, the city, and the calpolli". American Ethnologist. 9 (2): 230–249. doi:10.1525/ae.1982.9.2.02a00020. ISSN 1548-1425.
- Horcasitas, Fernando (1978). "Los descendientes de Nezahualpilli: Documentos del cacicazgo de Tetzcoco (1545-1855)". Estudios de Historia Novohispana (in Spanish). 6 (6). doi:10.22201/iih.24486922e.1978.006.3260. ISSN 1870-9060.
- Lee, Jongsoo (2003). "A Reinterpretation of Nahuatl Poetics: Rejecting the Image of Nezahualcoyotl as a Peaceful Poet". Colonial Latin America Review. 12 (2): 233–249. doi:10.1080/10609160032000153210. ISSN 1466-1802.
- Lee, Jongsoo (2006). "Reexamining Nezahualcóyotl's Texcoco: politics, conquests and law". Estudios de Cultura Náhuatl. 37: 231–252. ISSN 3061-8002.
- Lesbre, Patrick (2001). "El Tetzcutzinco en la obra de Fernando de Alva Ixtlilxóchitl: realeza, religión prehispánica y cronistas coloniales". Estudios de Cultura Náhuatl (in Spanish). 32: 323–340. ISSN 3061-8002.
- Lesbre, Patrick (2007). "Los fuegos del Palacio real de Tetzcoco (Mapa Quinatzin): ¿una alusión a la realeza sagrada?". Estudios de Cultura Náhuatl (in Spanish). 38: 101–127. ISSN 3061-8002.
- McAfee, Byron; Barlow, R. H. (1946). "The Titles of Tetzcotzinco (Santa María Nativitas)". Tlalocan. Revista de fuentes para el conocimiento de las culturas indígenas de México. 2 (2): 110–127. doi:10.19130/iifl.tlalocan.1946.405. ISSN 2954-5242.
- Mohar Betancourt, Luz María (1998). "Glifos y nombres en el Mapa Quinatzin" (PDF). Amerindia (in Spanish) (23): 1–15. ISSN 0221-8852.
- Nájera Muldoon, Oralba Castillo (2015). "La Biblioteca del Niño Mexicano: descripción, características y uso pedagógico". Correo del Maestro: Revista para profesores de educación básica (in Spanish) (234): 47–56. ISSN 1405-3616.
- Offner, Jerome A. (2010). "Un segundo vistazo al Códice de Xicotepec" [A Second Look at the Códice de Xicotepec]. Itinerarios (in Spanish). 11: 55–83. ISSN 1507-7241.
- Prusaczyk, Daniel; Juszczyk, Karolina; Martínez Garcida, Araceli Rojas (2023). "New Insights Into the Water Management System at Tetzcotzinco, Mexico". Open Archaeology. 9 (1). De Gruyter. doi:10.1515/opar-2022-0311. ISSN 2300-6560.
- Rodríguez Figueroa, Andrea Berenice (2023). "Huellas y memorias en el Tetzcotzinco". Gaceta de Museos (in Spanish) (78): 36–42. ISSN 1870-5650.
- Santamarina Novillo, Carlos (1998). "La muerte de Chimalpopoca: evidencias a favor de la tesis golpista". Estudios de Cultura Náhuatl (in Spanish). 28: 277–316. ISSN 3061-8002.
- Torres-Alves, Gina Alexandra; Morales-Nápoles, Oswaldo (2020). "Reliability analysis of flood defenses: The case of the Nezahualcoyotl dike in the aztec city of Tenochtitlan". Reliability Engineering and System Safety. 203. doi:10.1016/j.ress.2020.107057. ISSN 0951-8320.

==== Dissertations ====
- Aguilar Ochoa, José Arturo (1991). La fotografía durante el imperio de Maximiliano 1864-1867 (Lic. thesis) (in Spanish). Mexico, D.F.: Universidad Nacional Autónoma de México. hdl:20.500.14330/TES01000158737.
- Alfaro Gómez, Cecilia (2006). Las damas de Carlota. El papel de las mujeres bajo el Segundo Imperio (Lic. thesis) (in Spanish). Mexico, D.F.: Universidad Nacional Autónoma de México. hdl:20.500.14330/TES01000626585.
- Martínez Rodríguez, Fabiola (2004). Civilizing the Prehispanic: Neo-Prehispanic Imagery and Constructions of Nationhood in Porfirian Mexico (1876-1910) (PhD thesis). Vol. 1. United Kingdom: University of the Arts London.
- Pineda Mendoza, Raquel (1995). Origen, vida y muerte del acueducto de Santa Fe (Master's thesis) (in Spanish). Mexico, D.F.: Universidad Nacional Autónoma de México. hdl:20.500.14330/TES01000227207.

==== Online ====
- "Genealogie von Tezcoco". Staatliche Museen zu Berlin (in German). n.d.
- Barofsky, Sydney (7 April 2024). "Diego Rivera, Pan-American Unity (1940)". Ancient Americas, Appropriated.
- Elizarraraz Morales, José Antonio (n.d.). "Municipio de Nezahualcóyotl". H. Ayuntamiento de Nezahualcóyotl (in Spanish).
- Guzmán García, Gustavo; Sánchez Sánchez, Ernesto (12 December 2019). "La huida de Nezahualcòyotl: un cuadro de Luis Coto en Querétaro". Texcoco en el Tiempo (in Spanish).
- Jacquot, Olivier (12 April 2018a). "Mexicain 89-8 : Mapa Quinatzin (f. 1-2)". Amoxcalli, Hypotheses (in French). doi:10.58079/b1yu.
- Jacquot, Olivier (10 November 2018b). "Mexicain 312 : Copie de l'Histoire de Culhuacan et Mexico d'Ixtlilxochitl". Amoxcalli, Hypotheses (in French). doi:10.58079/b25p.
- Stavans, Ilan (27 March 2025). "Poet, Mystic, Warrior, Visionary: Reimagining the Life and Art of an Aztec Ruler Lost in Myth". Literary Hub.

Preceded by Ixtlilxochitl I	Tlatoani of Texcoco; 1431–1472	Succeeded by Nezahualpilli
