= Quinatzin =

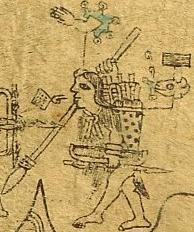
- Quinatzin in Codex Xolotl

Tlatoani of Texcoco
- Reign: 1298–1357
- Successor: Techotlalatzin
- Born: Quinatzin
- Spouse: Cuauhcihuatzin
- Issue: Techotlalatzin
- Father: Tlotzin Pochotl
- Mother: Princess Icpacxochitl

Quinatzin (full name: Quinatzin Tlaltecatzin) (kinat͡sin t͡ɬaltekat͜sin, modern Nahuatl pronunciation) was a King of ancient Texcoco, an Acolhua city-state in Mexico. He was the first known ruler of that city and is also known as Quinatzin II.

It was Quinatzin who transferred the seat of Chichimec power to Texcoco, relegating the city of Tenayuca to a site of secondary importance.

The father of Quinatzin was Tlotzin Pochotl, son of Nopaltzin, son of Xolotl, and his mother was a noblewoman named Icpacxochitl.

Quinatzin's wife was a Princess from Huejotla, Queen Cuauhcihuatzin, mother of his successor Techotlalatzin. Her grandson was Ixtlilxochitl I.

Quinatzin’s mother-in-law was called Tomiyauh.

== See also ==
- Mapa Quinatzin, a 16th-century Nahua pictorial document
