= List of tlatoque of Tetzcoco =

List of monarchs

Glyph of Tetzcoco

This is a list of Mesoamerican tlatoque of the altepetl of Tetzcoco from the first tlatoani in 1298 to the end of the line of indigenous rulers. From the early 15th century to 1521, Tetzcoco was one of the three leading members of the Triple Alliance, commonly known as the Aztec Empire, but was often subservient to the rulers of Tenochtitlan. The Aztec Empire was conquered by Spain in 1521, but the Spanish colonial authorities continued to appoint tlatoque of Tetzcoco until the office was abolished in 1564.

== Pre-colonial rulers (1298–1521) ==
=== Early Tetzcoco (1298–1431) ===
The tlatoque of Tetzcoco were descendants and successors of earlier tlatoque of the Chichimeca, succeeding Xolotl (1172–1232), Nopaltzin (1232–1263) and Tlotzin (1263–1298).

Portrait	Name	Reign	Succession and notes	Life details
	Quinatzin; Quinatzin	1298–1357 (59 years)	First tlatoani of Tetzcoco.	? – 1357 Died of natural causes
	Techotlalatzin; Techotlala	1357–1409 (52 years)	Son of Quinatzin (1298–1357).	? – 1409 Died of natural causes
	Ixtlilxochitl I Ixtlilxochitl	1409–1418 (9 years)	Son of Techotlalatzin (1357–1409).	? – 1520 Executed by the Tepanec conqueror Tezozomoc.
	Yancuiltzin; Yancuiltzin	1418–1431 (13 years)	Son of Ixtilxochtli I (1409–1418). Appointed by Tezozomoc. Co-ruler with Tochpilli under Tepanec suzerainty.	Unknown fate
	Tochpilli; Tochpilli	1418–1431 (13 years)	Son of Ixtilxochtli I (1409–1418). Appointed by Tezozomoc. Co-ruler with Yancuiltzin under Tepanec suzerainty.	Unknown fate

=== In the Triple Alliance (1431–1521) ===
Portrait	Name	Reign	Succession and notes	Life details
	Nezahualcoyotl; Nezahualcoyōtl	1431–1472 (41 years)	Son of Ixtilxochtli I (1409–1418). Nearly executed by Tezozomoc in 1418 but escaped with the aid of Itzcoatl of Tenochtitlan. Became king in 1431 during Tenochtitlan's uprising against the Tepanecs; founding member of the Triple Alliance (Aztec Empire) who led great campaigns of conquest.	? – 1472 Died of natural causes
	Nezahualpilli; Nezahualpilli	1472–1515 (43 years)	Son of Nezahualcoyotl (1431–1472).	? – 1515 Died of natural causes
	Cacamatzin; Cacamatzin	1515–1519 (4 years)	Son of Nezahualpilli (1472–1515). Revolted against the forces of Hernán Cortés after they imprisoned Moctezuma II in 1519.	? – 1520 Arrested by Cortés and deposed. Died shortly thereafter.
	Cuicuizcatl; Cuicuizcatl	1519–1520 (less than a year)	Son of Nezahualpilli (1472–1515). Appointed by Hernán Cortés in Tenochtitlan after Cacamatzin's revolt; never took power in Tetzcoco itself and not regarded as legitimate by the city's nobility.	? – 1520 Escaped Tenochtitlan during La Noche Triste. Executed by Coanacoch, who believed he was sent home by the Spaniards.
	Coanacoch; Coanacochtzin	1520–1521 (1 year)	Son of Nezahualpilli (1472–1515). Elected in Tetzcoco as Cacamatzin's successor.	? – 1524 Fled to Tenochtitlan in 1521 after the approach of the Spaniards. Captured there later in the same year. Executed by Cortés in 1524.

== Colonial period (1521–1564) ==
The line of tlatoque continued in Tetzococo after the Spanish conquest. Adept at navigating the new Spanish colonial governing system and adapting to changing circumstances, many of the nobles of Tetzcoco, including the tlatoque, came through the cataclysmic downfall of the Aztec Empire in a stronger position than they had been previously. Allowing the nobility of Tetzcoco to continue to appoint local rulers of the same pre-colonial dynasty was also beneficial for the Spaniards, who utilized their legitimacy to ensure the delivery of tribute and political subordination.

Portrait	Name	Reign	Succession and notes	Life details
	Tecocoltzin; Fernando Tecocoltzin	1521 (less than a year)	Son of Nezahualpilli (1472–1515). Appointed by Hernán Cortés after the flight of Coanacoch due to his sympathies for the Spaniards. Tecocoltzin repopulated and strengthened Tetzcoco and also took a leading role in the offensive against Tenochtitlan.	? – 1521 Died of natural causes just before the fall of Tenochtitlan
	Ixtlilxochitl II; Fernando Cortés Ixtlilxochitl	1521–1531 (10 years)	Son of Nezahualpilli (1472–1515). Previously a rival claimant to the position of tlatoani. Appointed by Hernán Cortés.	? – 1531 Died of natural causes
	Yoyontzin; Jorge Yoyontzin	1532–1533 (1 year)	Son of Nezahualpilli (1472–1515).	? – 1533 Died of natural causes
	Tetlahuehuetzquititzin; Pedro Tetlahuehuetzquititzin	1534–1539 (5 years)	Son of Nezahualpilli (1472–1515). Previously passed over in 1515 in favor of Cacamatzin.	? – May 1539 Died of natural causes
	Tlahuitoltzin; Antonio Pimentel Tlahuitoltzin	1540–1545 (5 years)	Son of Nezahualpilli (1472–1515). Politically skilled, Tiahuitoltzin's rule was a period of relative stability in Tetzcoco despite the upheaval that ravaged Mesoamerica at the time.	? – 1545 Died of natural causes
	Ihuian; Hernando Pimentel Ihuian	1545–1564 (19 years)	Son of Coanacoch (1520–1521). Politically skilled like his predecessor, also oversaw a peaceful and stable period in Tetzcoco.	? – 1564 Died of natural causes

The state of affairs in Tetzcoco after the death of Ihuian in 1564 is unclear given that few surviving sources discuss local politics during this time. It seems that the position of tlatoani was left vacant due to interfamilial conflict in regard to who was to be the next ruler, which in turn led to the office being entirely replaced by the Spanish-appointed governors of the city.

== See also ==
- The other leaders of the Triple Alliance:
  - List of tlatoque of Tenochtitlan
  - List of rulers of Tlacopan
- History of the Aztecs
- Other rulers to the south:
  - Maya monarchs
  - Mixtec monarchs
