= Azcasuch =

Mexican politician

Azcaxochitl, or Azcasuch (Classical Nahuatl: Āzcaxōch [aːsˈkaʃoːtʃ]) was a cihuatlatoani (queen) of the pre-Columbian Acolhua altepetl of Tepetlaoztoc in the Valley of Mexico. Her name is Nahuatl for a kind of a flower (literally "ant-flower").

She is believed to have been a daughter of Nezahualcoyotl, ruler of Texoco. Azcasuch married Cocopin, the ruler of Tepetlaoztoc, c. 1431. After her husband's death, she ascended to the throne herself as queen regnant. She reigned in 1489–1498.

Azcasuch was succeeded by her grandson, Diego Tlilpotonqui.

| Preceded by Cocopin | Tlatoani of Tepetlaoztoc | Succeeded by Diego Tlilpotonqui |
