= Diego Tlilpotonqui =

Mexican politician

- Tlatoani
- Reign: c. 1519

Don Diego Tlilpotonqui was the tlatoani ('ruler' or 'king') of the pre-Columbian Acolhua altepetl (ethnic state) of Tepetlaoztoc in the Valley of Mexico. He was ruling Tepetlaoztoc when the Spanish arrived in 1519.

Tlilpotonqui was the grandson of Cocopin, who had previously been ruler of Tepetlaoztoc. Upon Cocopin's death, his wife Azcasuch, a daughter of Nezahualcoyotl, the ruler of Texcoco, succeeded him as cihuatlatoani (queen regnant). After Azcasuch's death, the position became Tlilpotonqui's.

With his conversion to Christianity, Tlilpotonqui was baptized and given the Spanish name Diego.

Tlilpotonqui left no legitimate children. Upon his death, his nephew Don Luis de Tejada became tlatoani.

Preceded by Azcasuch	Tlatoani of Tepetlaoztoc	Succeeded by Luis de Tejada
