= Huejotla =

Archaeological site in Mexico

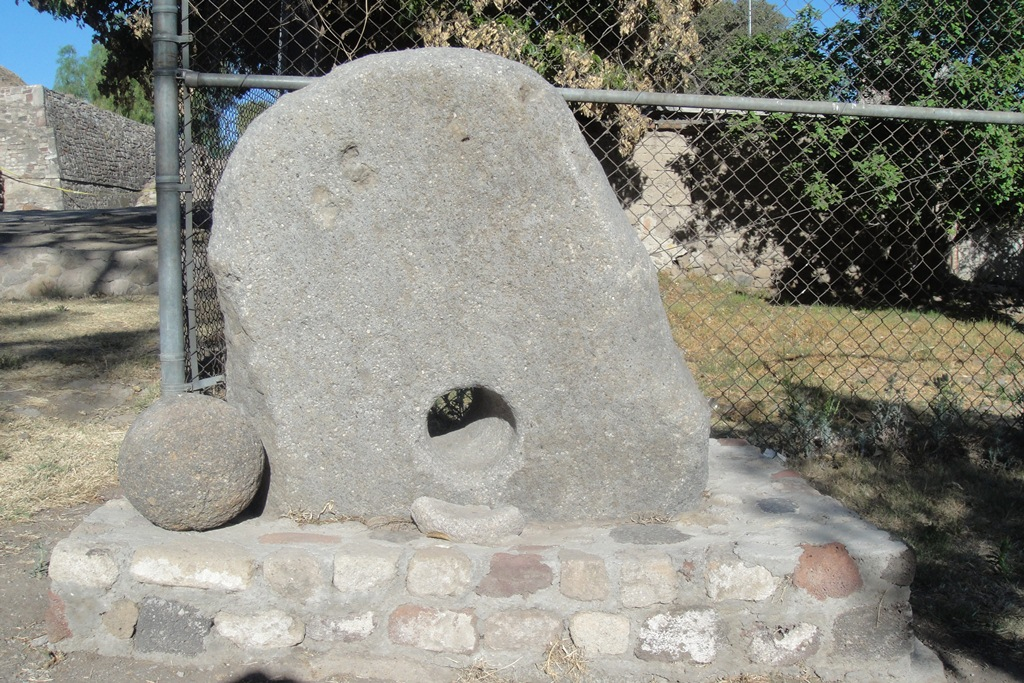
- Monolith placed at the site entrance, structure 1 in the background
- Interactive map of Huejotla
- Periods: Mesomamerican preclassical, 1100 – 1350 CE
- Cultures: Otomi - Chichimeca
- Location: Texcoco, State of Mexico
- Region: Mexico

Site notes
- Website: Huejotla Archaeological Site

Huexotla or Huexotla is an archaeological site located 5 kilometers south of Texcoco, at the town of San Luis Huexotla, close to Chapingo, in the state of Mexico. Huexotla was one of the most important Acolhua cities, alongside Tetzcoco and Coatlinchan. Its development began in the 13th century.

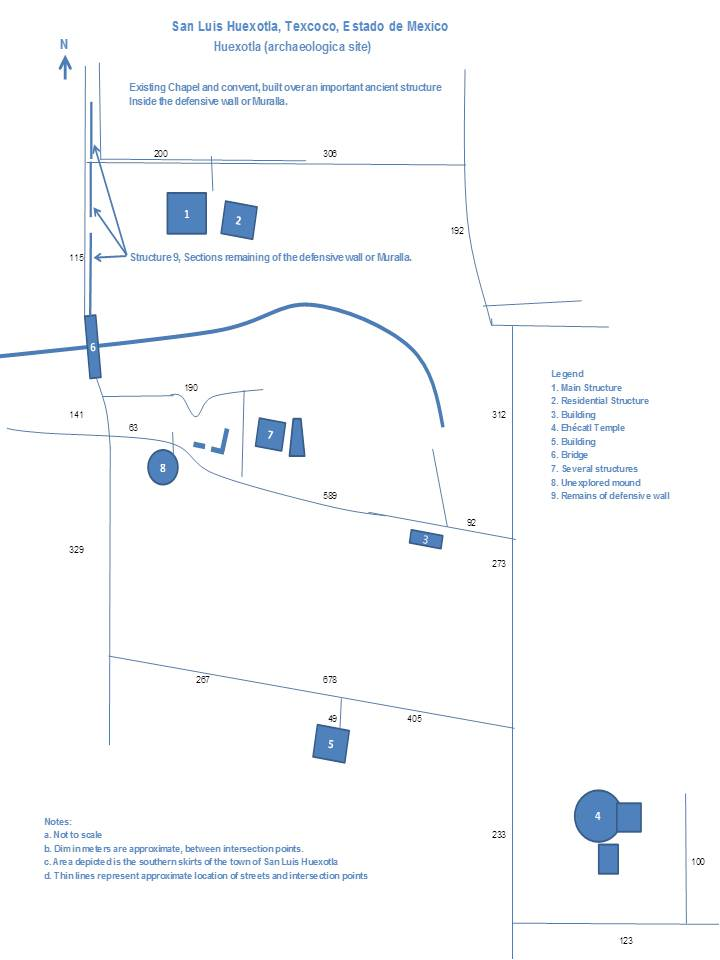
Site plan, approximate location of the various structures

Although few buildings remain in Huexotla, it was a very large city that extended well beyond the perimeter wall, in fact, the only known structure of its kind in the region from the late postclassical. It is believed that the center of Huexotla once existed at the place where the Franciscan convent and the Church of St. Louis were built. Around 1960 the site was explored by Eduardo Pareyón Moreno.

== Background ==
The Otomi peoples were likely the original inhabitants of the central Mexican highlands before the arrival of Nahuatl speakers around ca. 1000 AD, but were gradually replaced and marginalized by Nahua peoples.

Although no exact date of the establishment of the first humans in the Texcoco area is available, from historical review it is likely that the first settlers had Teotihuacan or Toltec origins. Historical sources based on the Xolotl, Tolotzin and Quinatzin codices, among others, indicate that its founders belonged to a Chichimeca group arriving in the Basin of Mexico and established in the province that the Aztecs called Acolhuacan.

=== Toponymy ===
Huexotla is a Nahuatl name that means "place of willows", and it probably refers to the forest that existed here during pre-Hispanic times, at the foot of Mt. Tlaloc.

=== Acolhua ===
The Acolhua are a Mesoamerican people who arrived in the Valley of Mexico in or around the year 1200 CE. The Acolhua were a sister culture of the Aztecs (or Mexica) as well as the Tepanec, Chalca, Xochimilca and others.

It is likely that the ruling family of the Acolhua were descendants from Otomi speakers and did not speak Nahuatl until decreed by their ruler (tlatoani) Techotlalatzin.

In 1415, Ixtlilxochitl held a meeting at Huexotla with his subordinate lords, where it was decided that Techotlalatzin's grandson Nezahualcoyotl would become the crown prince. During Nezahualcoyotl's reign, the Acolhua allied with the Mexica (Aztecs) in the Aztec Triple Alliance. The Acolhua capital, Texcoco, became a cultural center of the resultant Aztec Empire.

== The Site ==
The site and remains of pre-Hispanic constructions are scattered over an extensive area, between modern and colonial constructions as well as agricultural fields.

Unfortunately, site investigations were halted a couple of years ago, in spite of the fact that several unexplored mounds are identified in the zone.

It has different structures that comprise a central structures complex, from which ancient settlers small constructions groups and residential were distributed, Chichimeca vestiges were found, dating back to 1173 AD.

The groups are “La Muralla”, “La Estancia”, “La Comunidad”, El Grupo “Santa Maria”, “San Marcos and Santiago”.

Among the remaining archaeological vestiges is the Wall constructed between the San Bernardino and Chapingo rivers; the section better preserved is located west of the ex-convent. Towards the east are two basements, on top of the structure called “La Comunidad” are remains of rooms with furnaces.

=== Structures ===
The archeological site preserves an enigmatic set of battlement walls built between the San Bernardino and Chapingo rivers; the better-preserved section is west of the former convent.

Towards the east two plinths can be visited, on top of the “La Comunidad” section are remains of rooms with tlecuiles or braziers.

Over the San Bernardino river are several pre-Hispanic architectonic sets, two are especially interesting; the circular basement is a sample of temples dedicated to Ehécatl, “Wind God” (invocation of Quetzalcoatl), next to it is a small foundation, probably from a previous or contemporary to the first circular stage construction.

At the location of structures 1 and 2, is an INAH office, with a keeper that provides site information and literature.

The Santiago chapel is an example of the form in which Spaniards religiously converted American natives; the small chapel was built over a pre-Hispanic building (perhaps the most important).

Other two sets are the Observatory or San Marcos and Santa Maria, in the Santa Maria the different constructive stages are remarkable, and the use of pumice stone in the construction works.

The following numbers assigned to each structure are arbitrary, used for the sake of structure identification, in relation to the site plan. The orientation of all structures deviate from cardinal directions.

=== Structure 1 ===
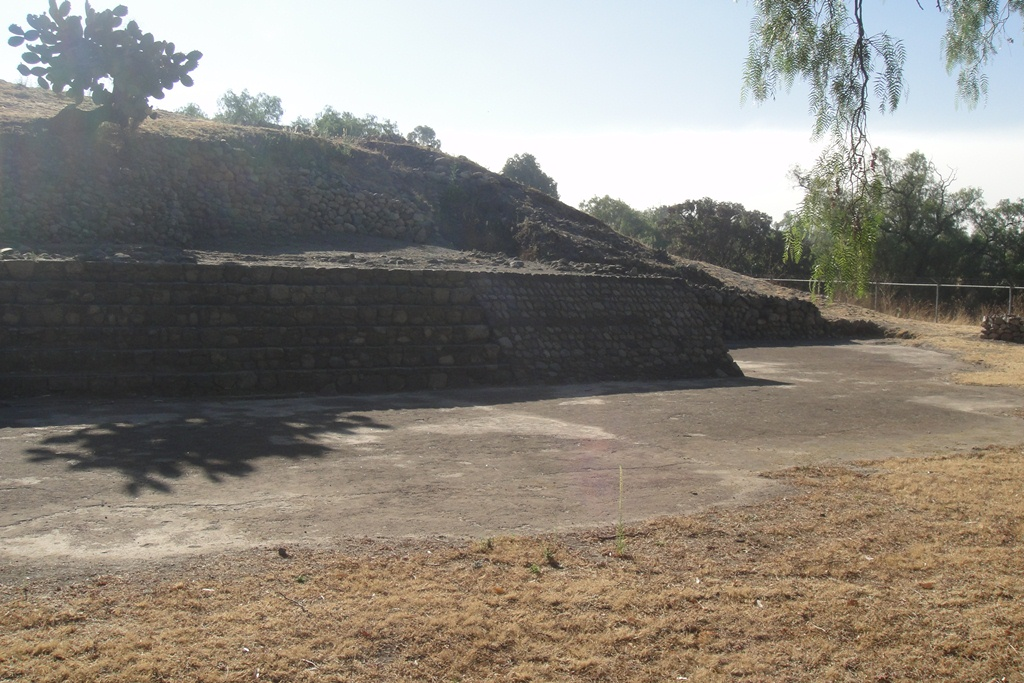
Structure 1, eastern access and stuccoed floor

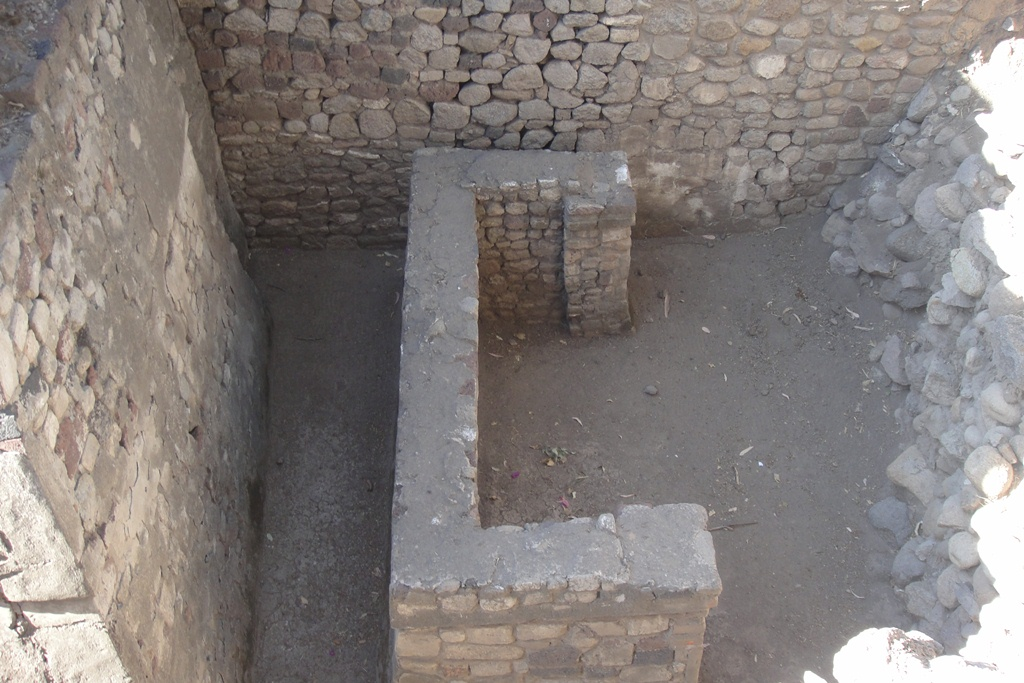
Structure 1, unknown structure below grade, North West corner

This platform represents the largest remaining structure, it is oriented east–west measuring some 48 square meters and there are indications of important constructive details.

On its western side is a large access stairway about 15 meters wide with 4 meter alfardas in both sides, except for a few sections, all other sides are now destroyed.

The northern side has, at both corners, remains of the side wall and stucco remains, that probably covered the entire building, the color with which was probably painted is not visible. The North West corner has a lower C-shaped structure about 6 meters below the current terrain, probably an indication of several stages of construction. Its purpose is not known. (See Lower Structure photograph)

=== Structure 2 ===
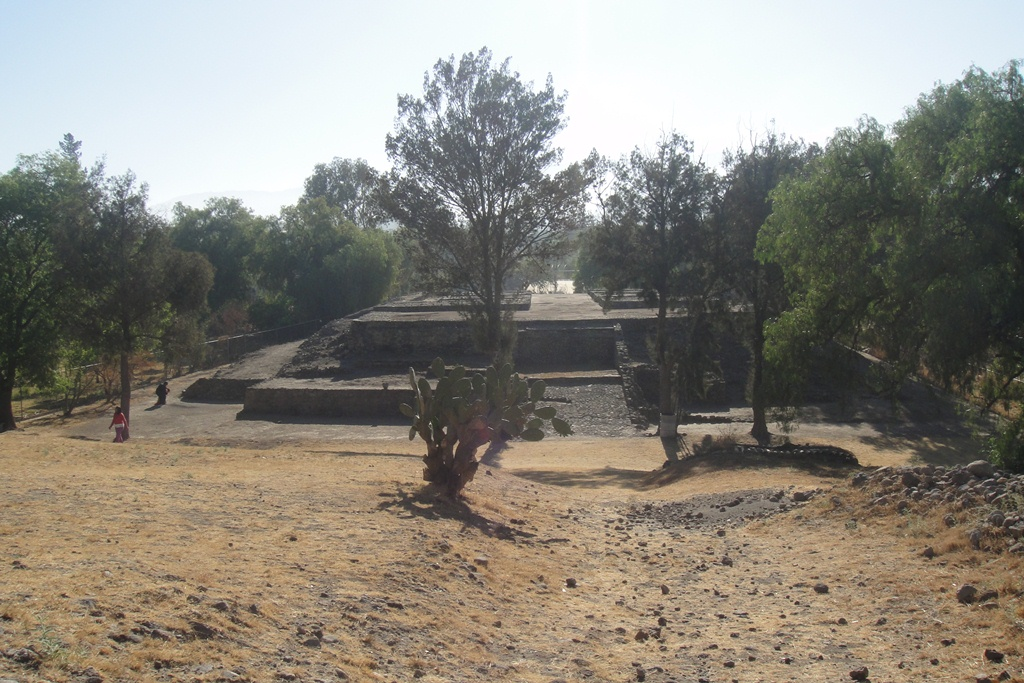
Structure 2 viewed from Structure 1

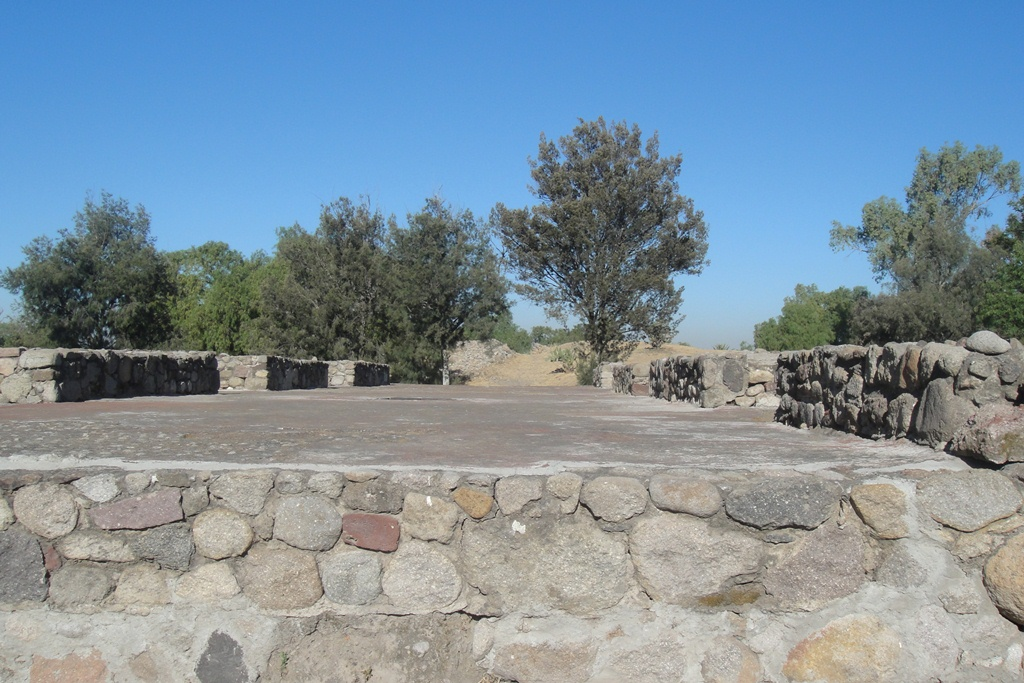
Structure 2, room or space distribution on top of the structure

This structure measures some 40 by 32 meters, it is east of Structure 1 and somewhat lower. Its orientation is also east – west and its alignment is shifted a few degrees. Due to its proximity, it is possible it was associated with the functions of Structure 1, possibly used for residential purposes.

Although no details of access stairways remain, on its western side, facing structure 1, is a sort of a ramp leading to and from structure 1.

On top of this structure there are several rooms, with access from a central hallway. The floor and wall remains have traces of red painted stucco. There are three square holes probably used as braziers, for cooking and heating purposes.

=== Structure 3 ===
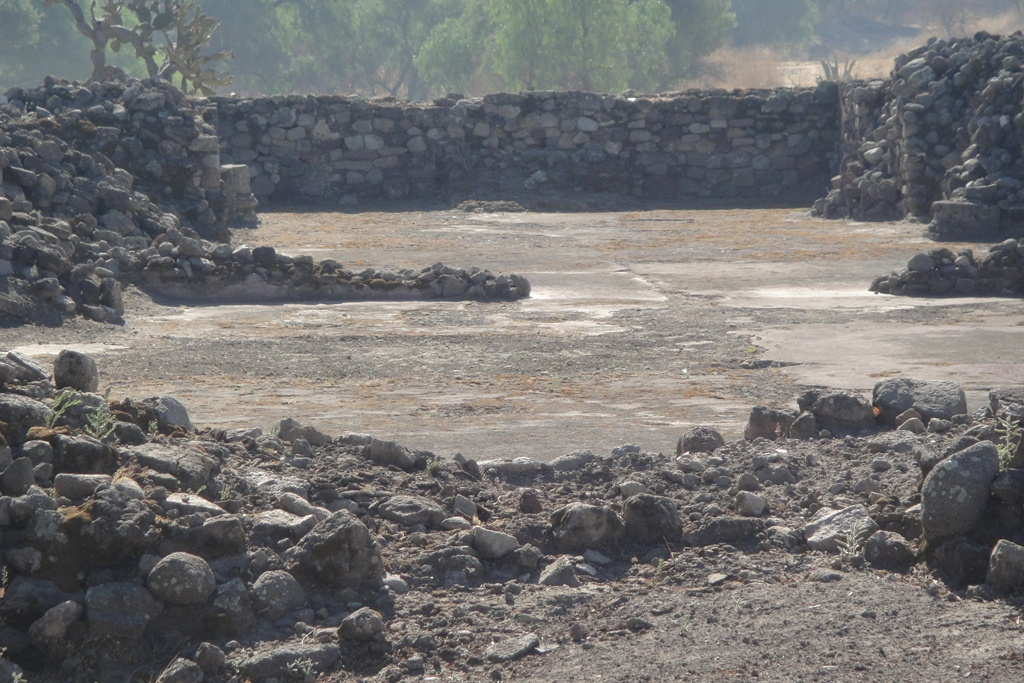
Structure 3, internal details

It is located to the south-east of the previous structures; it is highly destroyed measuring some 31 by 10 meters (102 by 33 ft). It is a rectangular building, with remains of the perimeter wall standing; apparently, it had several rooms, indicated by remains of internal dividing walls. It is located inside a fence.

=== Structure 4 ===
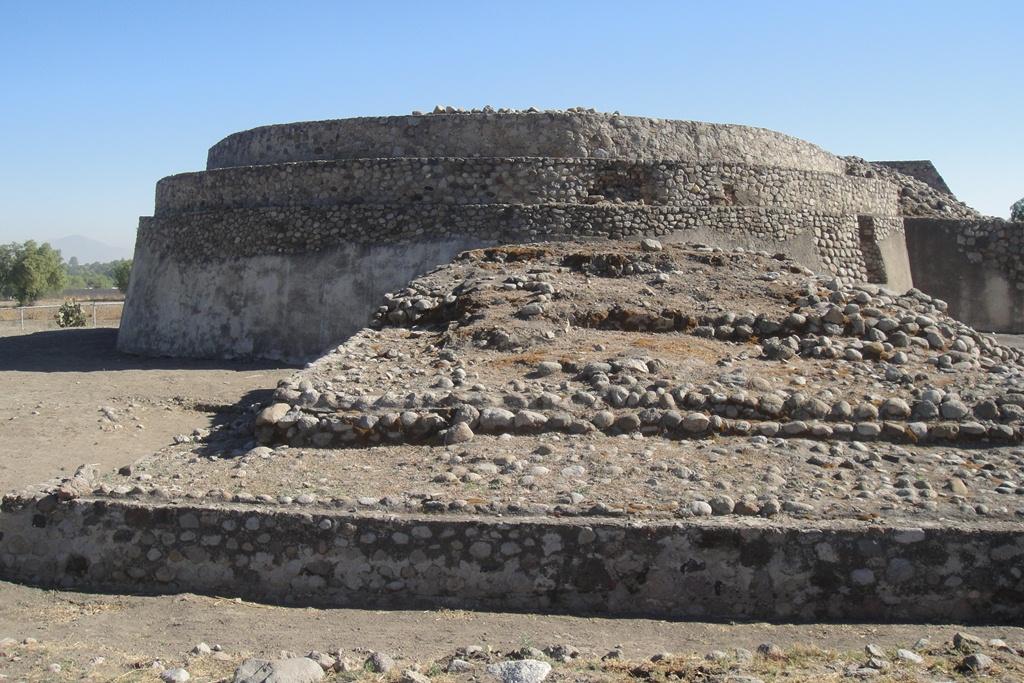
Structure 4, viewed from the south

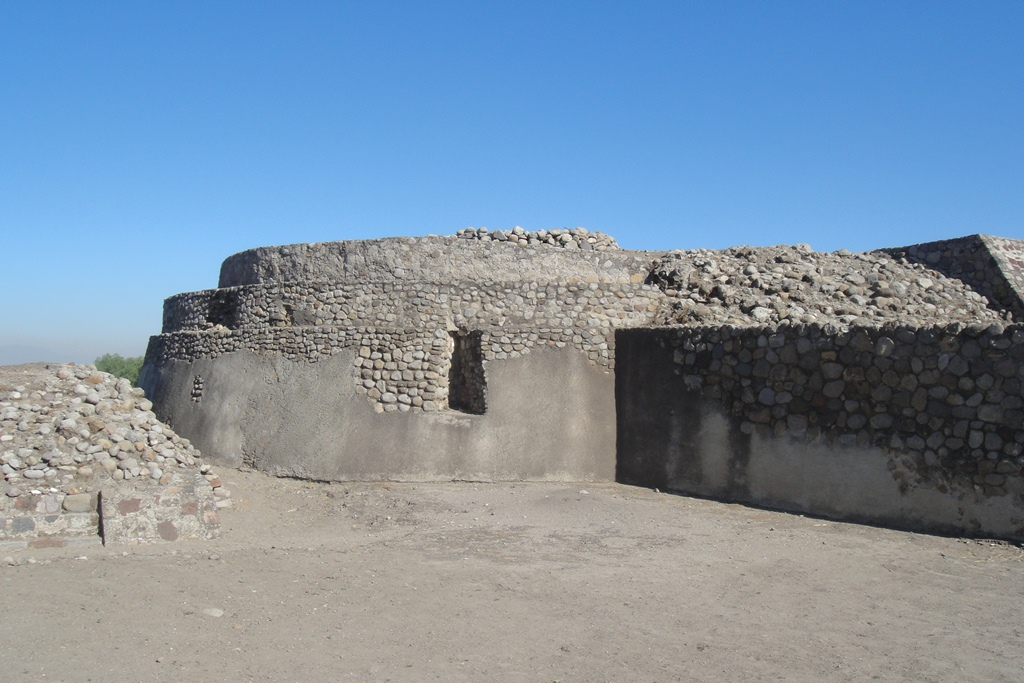
Structure 4 or Ehécatl Temple with side buildings

Ehécatl round temple probably used for ceremonial purposes, measuring some 15 meters in diameter. The structure has three stacked concentric round stages.

This structure has a square structure attached on its eastern side, and its overall length is about 25 meters, the square structure measures some 10 meters wide. This square structure probably had an access stairway, and depicts various structural details, for unknown purposes. On its south side there is another square structure, detached. It measure about 10 square meters possibly associated with ceremonies conducted in the temple.

=== Structure 5 ===
This structure is located some 500 meters west of structure 4. It is an irregular rectangular shape platform with some remaining walls and floors, measuring some 17.45 by 16.37 meters (57.3 by 53.7 ft). It is located inside a fence.

=== Structure 6 ===
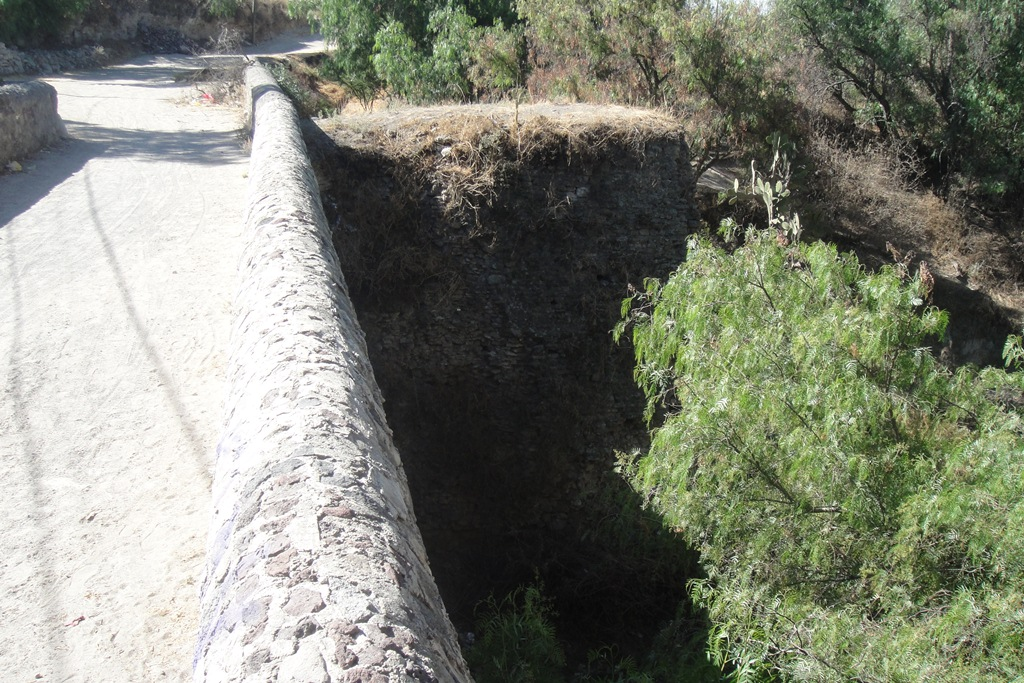
Huexotla Bridge, west side, see construction protrusion on the right side

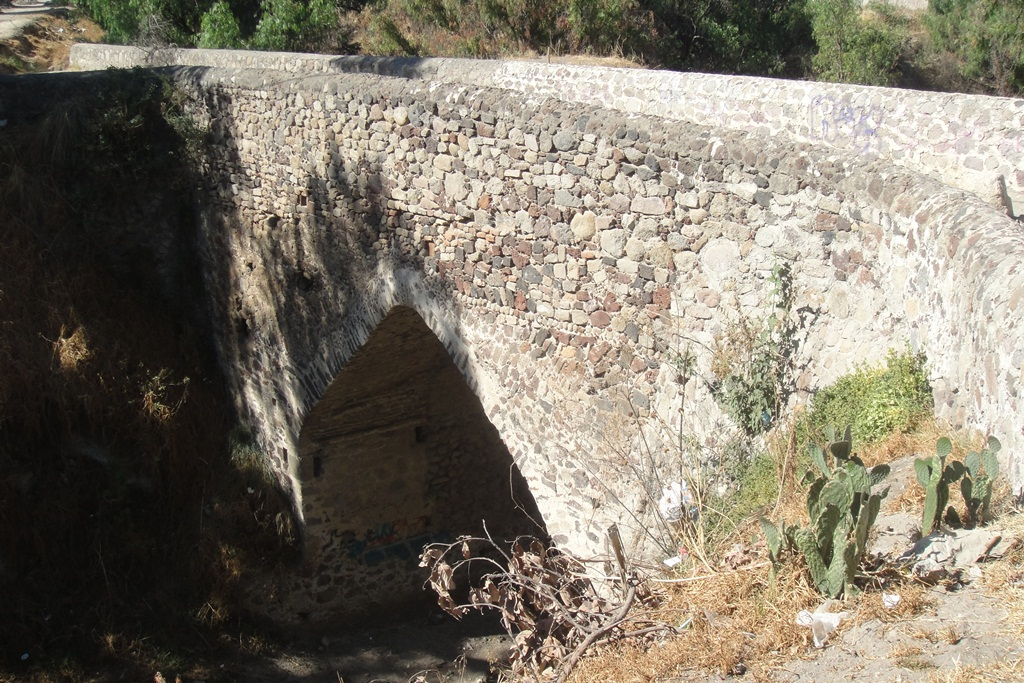
Huejotla Bridge

This structure is represented by a stone masonry pre-Hispanic bridge. Its overall length at the top is about 21.5 meters long by 4.9 meters wide (70 by 16 ft.). It has an equilateral pointed arch type construction, measures some 16 meters long, by 5 meters wide. The bridge top is about 15 meters over the ravine and river below and has a clear span of about 7 meters and it keystone is about 8 meters high.

A peculiarity of this structure consists of an attached structure on the bridge south-west corner that protrudes about six meters. Its purpose and characteristics are unknown.

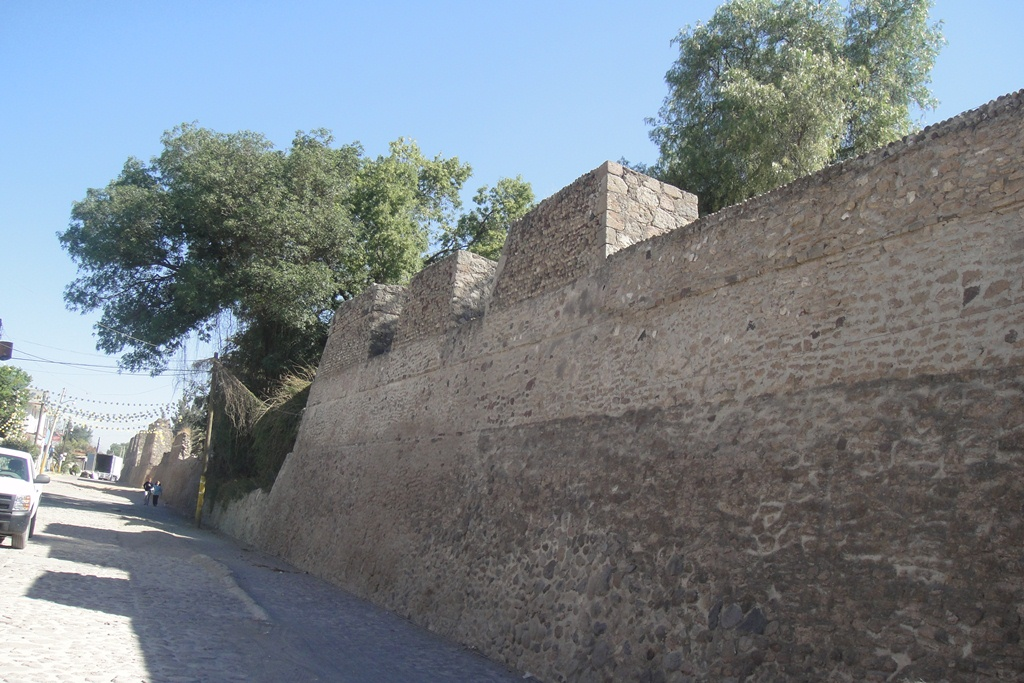
Huexotla defensive wall and battlements

=== Structure 7 ===
This structure comprises several constructed remains, and it is located across the river, south of structure 1. It consists of two irregular structures and walls remain.

=== Structure 8 ===
This item represents an unexplored mound.

=== Structure 9 ===
This structure represents remains of a defensive wall that probably surrounded the city. The structure measures about 6 meters high; with battlement protrusions extending two to three meters above. The walls are tapered with a width of about three meters at the bottom tapering down to about one meter at the top.

The walls are currently used to delimit private property areas, and the west side of the chapel.

== Gallery ==
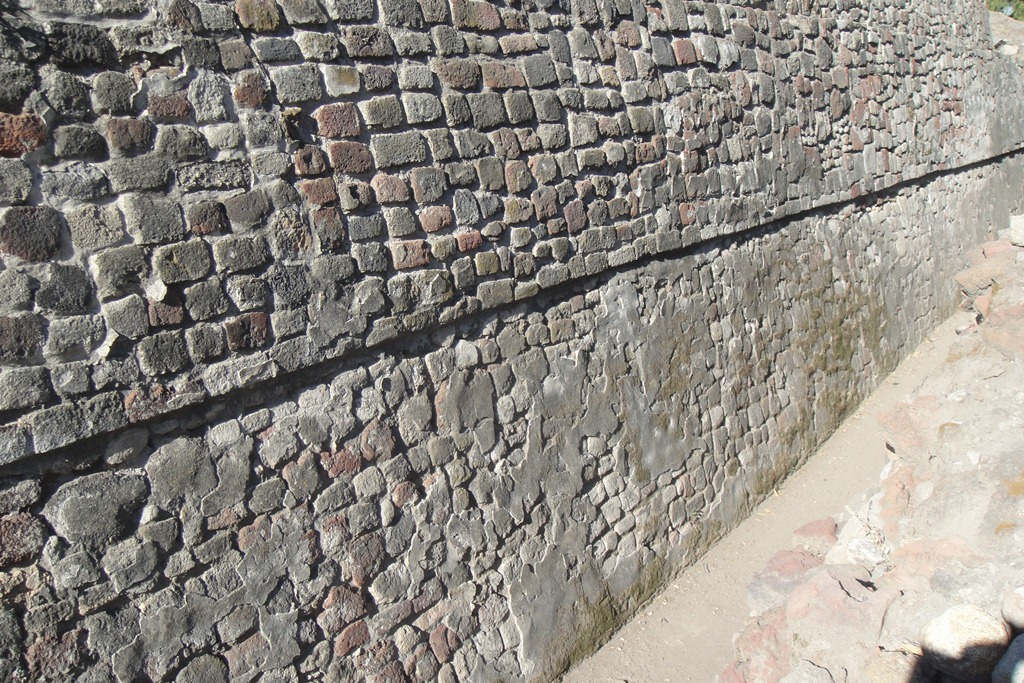
Structure 1, northern side

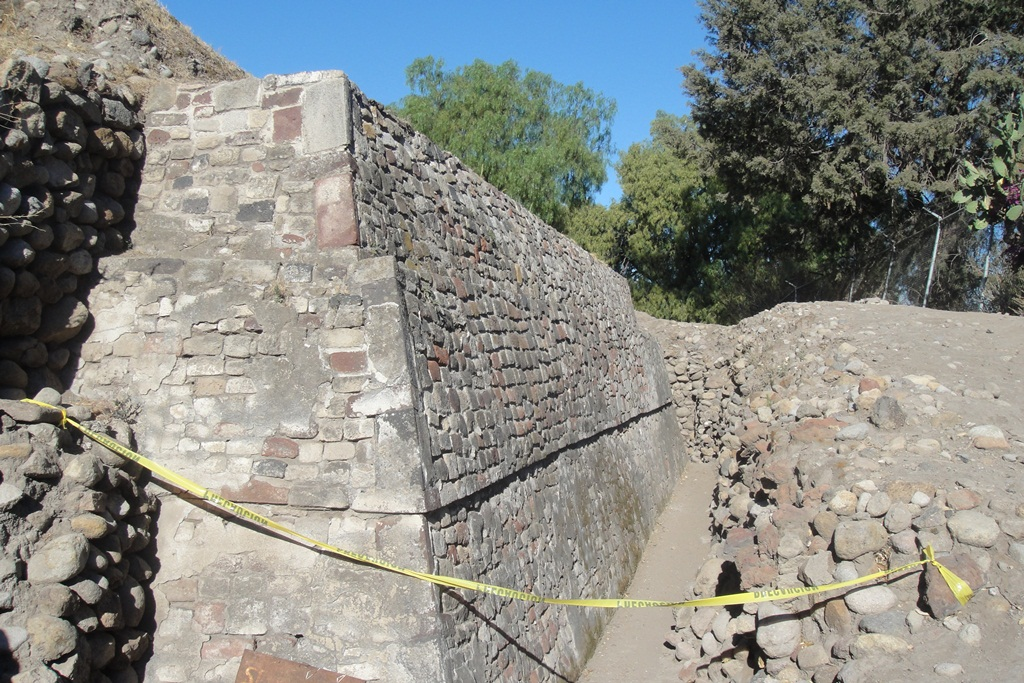
Structure 1, North-East corner

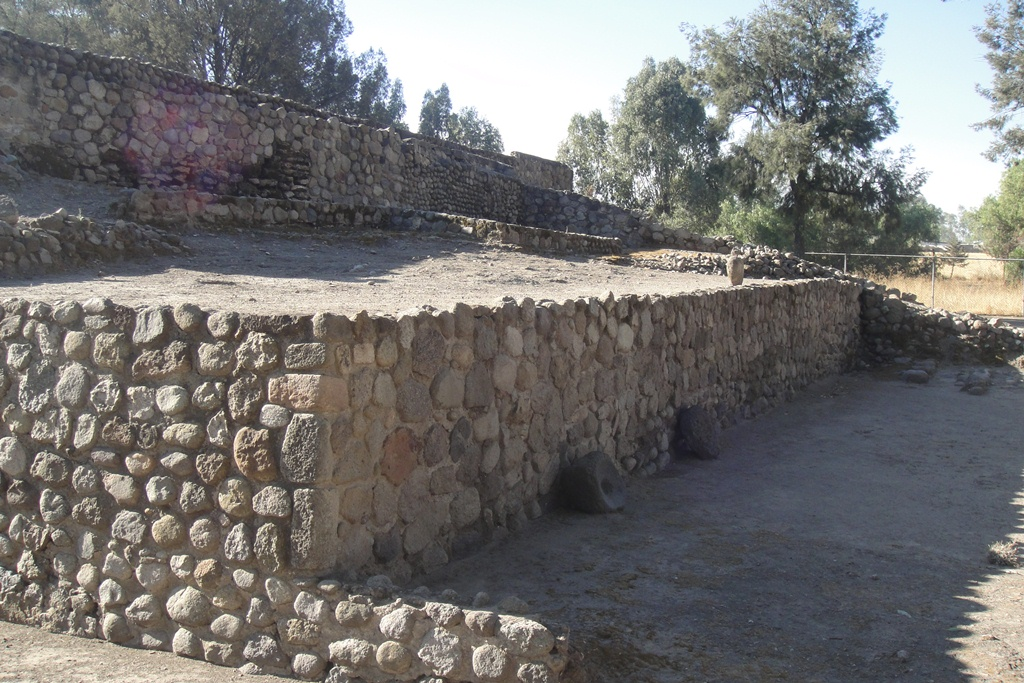
Structure 2, northern side

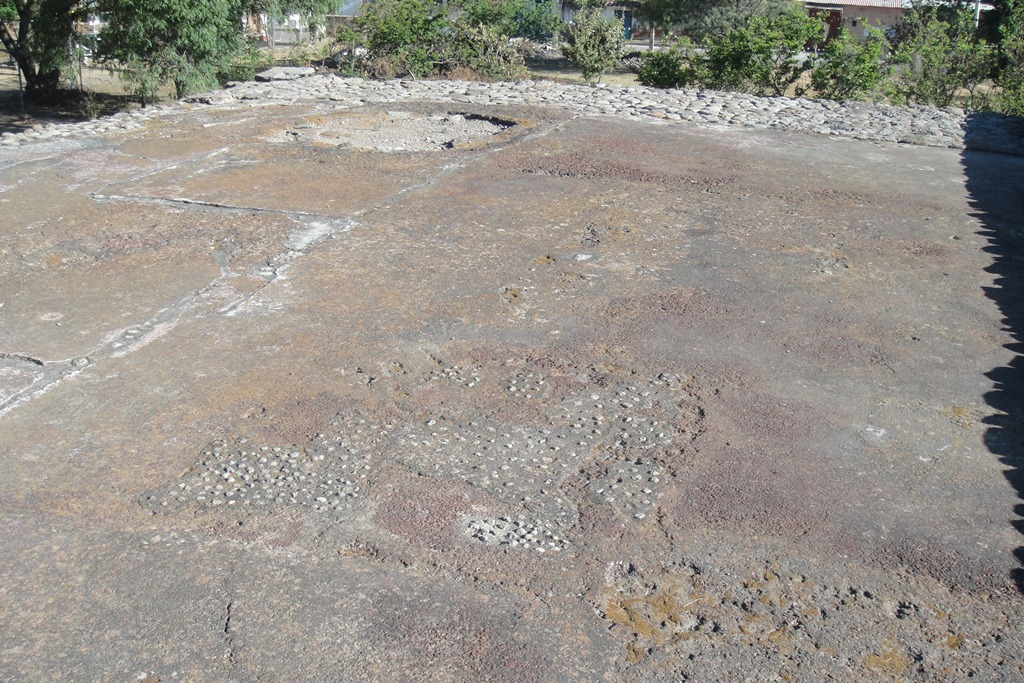
Structure 2, red stuccoed floor

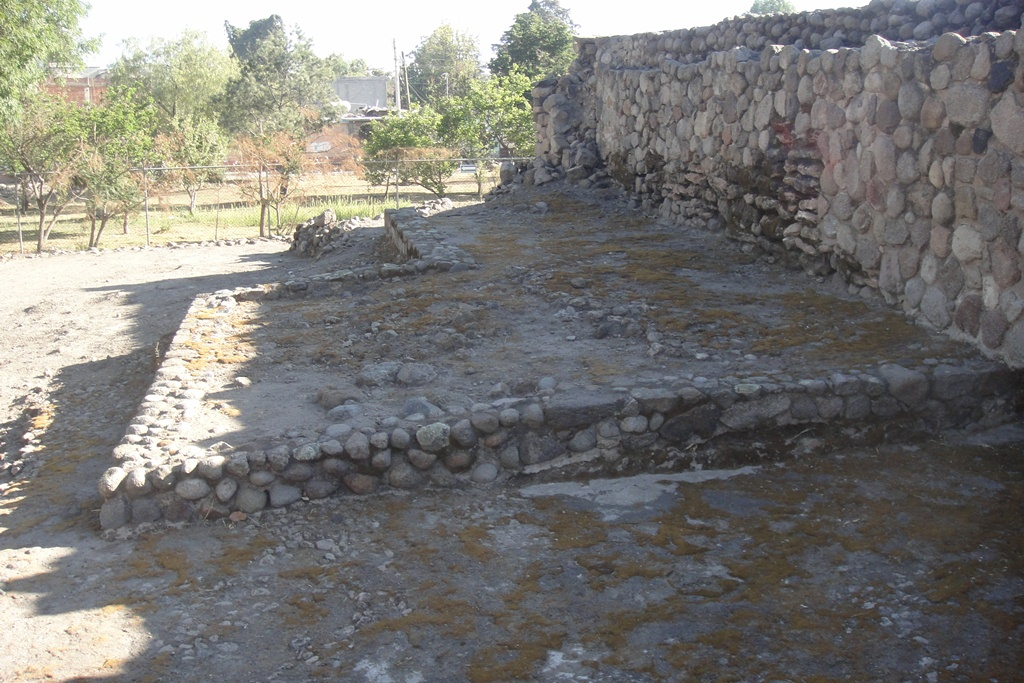
Structure 2, west side
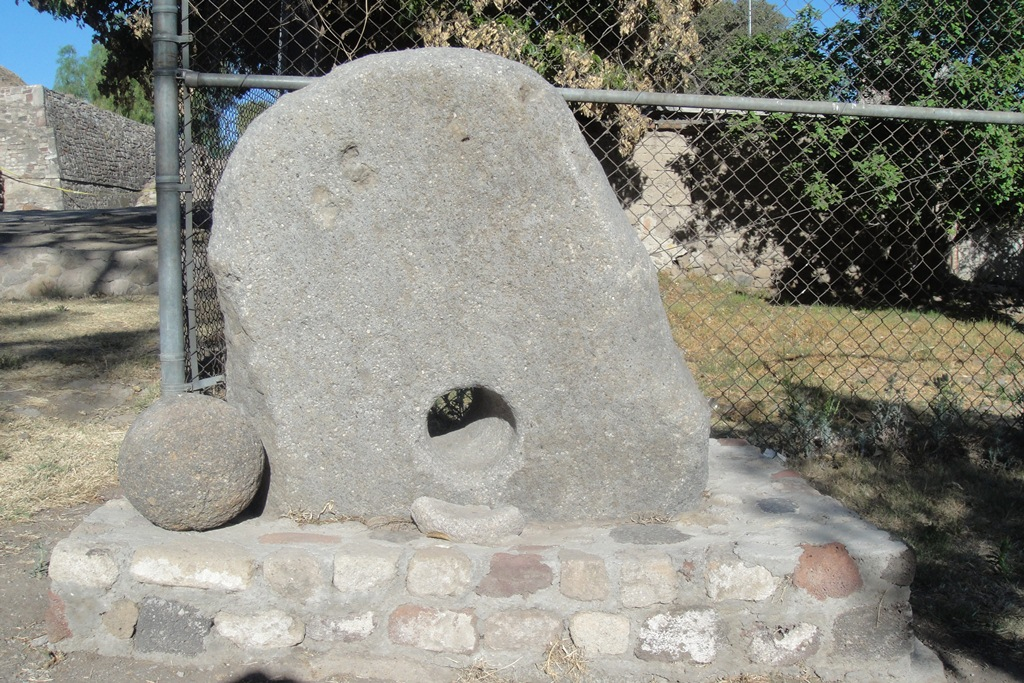
Monolith placed at the site entrance, structure 1 in the background

== Bibliography ==
- Davies, Nigel (1980). The Toltec Heritage: From the Fall of Tula to the Rise of Tenochtitlan. Civilization of the American Indian series, no. 153. Norman: University of Oklahoma Press. ISBN 0-8061-1505-X. OCLC 5103377.
- Smith, Michael E. (1984). "The Aztlan Migrations of Nahuatl Chronicles: Myth or History?" (PDF online reproduction). Ethnohistory. 31 (3). Durham, NC: Duke University Press, American Society for Ethnohistory: 153–186. doi:10.2307/482619. ISSN 0014-1801. JSTOR 482619. OCLC 145142543.
- Smith, Michael E. (2008) Aztec City-State Capitals. University Press of Florida, Gainesville (in press).
- Smith, Michael E. (2005). "City Size in Late Post-Classic Mesoamerica" (PDF). Journal of Urban History. 31 (4): 403–434. doi:10.1177/0096144204274396. S2CID 145452272.
- Wright Carr, David Charles (2005). "Precisiones sobre el término "otomí"" (PDF). Arqueología Mexicana (in Spanish). XIII (73): 19. Archived from the original (PDF) on 2005-11-08.
- Manuscritos Otomies del Virreinato - Paper in Spanish by David Wright Carr
- Otomies en las fuentes - Paper in Spanish by David Wright Carr
- Lengua cultura e historia de los Otomíes Paper in Spanish by David Wright Carr
