= Códice de Santa María Asunción =

The Códice de Santa María Asunción is mid-16th century Mesoamerican pictorial codex, with Nahuatl glosses, containing censuses of twelve rural communities in Tepetlaoztoc, in the Acolhua area near Texcoco. The codex contains provides important information about community economic and social structure shortly after the conquest. The editors of the facsimile edition estimate the codex was created in stages, with the core glyphic depictions drawn around 1544, with householders, cadastrals of their landholdings. They posit the alphabetic Nahuatl glosses were added later over 30-year period. The glosses include names of the householder, kin relationships, land assignments, and miscellaneous annotations. A third component the codex, called "The Asunción Land Title," is a lengthy account in Nahuatl that sets the territorial boundaries of the settlement (tlaxilacalli) of Santa María Asunción.

Analysis of this codex along with Codex Vergara have revealed details of a complex land survey system utilized by the Aztecs including the ability to calculate the areas of irregular plots of land.
