= History of the Aztecs =

The Aztecs were a Pre-Columbian Mesoamerican people of central Mexico in the 14th, 15th, and 16th centuries. They called themselves Mēxihcah (pronounced [meˈʃikaʔ]).

The capital of the Aztec Empire was Tenochtitlan. During the empire, the city was built on a raised island in Lake Texcoco. Modern-day Mexico City was constructed on the ruins of Tenochtitlan. The Spanish colonization of the Americas reached the mainland during the reign of Hueyi Tlatoani Moctezuma II (Montezuma II). In 1521, Hernán Cortés, along with an allied army of other Native Americans, conquered the Aztecs through siege warfare, psychological warfare, direct combat, and the spread of disease.

From 1375 until 1428, the Mexica were a tributary of Azcapotzalco. The Aztec rulers Acamapichtli, Huitzilihuitl and Chimalpopoca were, in fact, vassals of Tezozomoc, the Tepanec ruler of Azcapotzalco.

When Tezozomoc died in 1426, his son Malazia ascended to the throne of Azcapotzalco. Maxtla (as Malazia was also known) sought to tighten Azcapotzalco's grip on the nearby city-states in the Valley of Mexico. In the process, Chimalpopoca, tlatoani of Tenochtitlan, was assassinated by Maxtla's agents while Nezahualcoyotl of Texcoco was forced into exile.

== Arrival in the Valley of Mexico ==
In the Valley of Mexico (c. 1250 AD), there existed numerous city-states, including Chalco, Xochimilco, Tlacopan, Colhuacan, and Azcapotzalco. The most powerful were Culhuacan on the south shore of Lake Texcoco and Azcapotzalco on the west shore.

As a result, when the Mexica arrived in the Valley of Mexico as a semi-nomadic tribe, they found most of the area already occupied. In roughly 1248, they first settled on Chapultepec, a hill on the west shore of Lake Texcoco, the site of numerous springs.

In time, the Tepanecs of Azcapotzalco ousted the Mexica from Chapultepec, and the ruler of Culhuacan, Coxcoxtli, gave the Mexica permission to settle in the empty barrens of Tizaapan in 1299. There they married and assimilated into Culhuacan culture.

In 1323, they asked the new ruler of Culhuacan, Achicometl, for his daughter, in order to make her the goddess Yaocihuatl. Unknown to the king, the Mexica actually planned to sacrifice her. The Mexica believed that by doing this the princess would join the gods as a deity. As the story goes, during a festival dinner, a priest came out wearing her flayed skin as part of the ritual. Upon seeing this, the king and the people of Culhuacan were horrified and expelled the Mexica.

Forced to flee, in 1325 they went to a small island on the west side of Lake Texcoco where they began to build their city Tenochtitlan, eventually creating a large artificial island. It is said that the Aztec god, Huitzilopochtli, instructed the Aztecs to found their city at the location where they saw an eagle, on a cactus, with a snake in its talons (which is on the current Mexican flag). The Aztecs, apparently, saw this vision on the small island where Tenochtitlan was founded.

Another Mexica group settled on the north side of this island: this would become the city of Tlatelolco. Originally, this was an independent Mexica kingdom, but eventually, it was absorbed by Tenochtitlan, and treated as a "fifth" quadrant. The famous marketplace described by Hernán Cortés and Bernal Diaz del Castillo was actually located in Tlatelolco.

In 1376 the Mexica elected their first tlatoani, Acamapichtli, following customs learned from the Culhuacan. These customs required nonstop daily cleaning as a ritual.

== Aztec Triple Alliance ==
The Triple Alliance of Tenochtitlan, Texcoco, and Tlacopan would, in the next 100 years, come to dominate and extend its power to both the Gulf of Mexico and the Pacific shores. From the beginning of the Triple Alliance, Tenochtitlan was mostly in charge of the military and conquest, whereas the other two cities had other responsibilities. This military dominance of Tenochtitlan gradually led to this city becoming the dominant power in the alliance. When the alliance received tributes 2/5 went to Tenochtitlan, 2/5 to Texcoco, and 1/5 to Tlacopan.

=== The reign of Itzcoatl 1427–1440 ===
The first Tlatoani of the Triple Alliance was Itzcoatl and he, along with his Texcocan co-ruler Nezahualcoyotl, began expanding the territory dominated by the alliance towards the south, conquering Nahua-speaking cities like Cuauhnahuac (now Cuernavaca), and towards Huexotla, Coatlinchan, and Tepoztlan in the modern-day state of Morelos which was then dominated by the Tlahuica. During this period the Nahuan cities immediately on the lakeside, such as Xochimilco, Culhuacan and Mixquic were also subdued.

=== Moctezuma I and Tlacaelel 1440–1469 ===
Two of the primary architects of the Aztec empire were the half-brothers Tlacaelel and Moctezuma I. They were sons of Huitzilíhuitl, the 3rd Hueyi Tlatoani, half-brothers to Chimalpopoca, the 4th Hueyi Tlatoani, and nephews of Itzcoatl, the 5th. Moctezuma I succeeded Itzcoatl as the 6th Hueyi Tlatoani in 1449. Tlacaelel became the power behind the throne and reformed both the Aztec state and the Aztec religion.

Moctezuma I began the expansion in earnest. First, he had to reconquer towns first conquered by Itzcoatl, but had since rebelled. He asked several smaller cities to contribute to the construction of a new Great Temple, and only Chalco refused, which caused Moctezuma to start a war against them that lasted for several years. He then conquered Huastec territory under the pretext of securing Aztec merchants in that area, and then he went to war against the Mixtecs of Coixtlahuaca. Coixtlahuaca was successfully conquered although the Mixtec ruler Atonal received military assistance from the Nahua states of Tlaxcala and Huexotzinco, by now enemies of the Aztecs. After the defeat of Coixtlahuaca many Mixtec artisans were relocated to the Aztec capital. Later Moctezuma marched upon the Totonacan cities of Vera Cruz and conquered Xalapa, Cosamaloapan, Cotaxtla (modern-day Cuetlachtlan), Ahuilizapan (Modern day Orizaba) and north into Huastec territory conquering Tuxpan and Xilotepec.

==== Tlacaelel ====
Tlacaelel was one of the primary architects of the Aztec empire. Rising to prominence during the war against the Tepanec in the late 1420s, Tlacaelel wielded power as something of a Grand Vizier during the reigns of four Hueyi Tlatoani, until his death in 1487.

Tlacaelel recast or strengthened the concept of the Aztecs as a chosen people and elevated the tribal god/hero Huitzilopochtli to the top of the pantheon of gods. In tandem with this, Tlacaelel increased the level and prevalence of human sacrifice, particularly during a period of natural disasters that started in 1446 (according to Durán). During the reign of Moctezuma I, he instigated the flower wars in which the Aztecs fought Tlaxcala and other Nahuan city-states.

To strengthen the Aztec nobility, he helped create and enforce sumptuary laws, prohibiting commoners from wearing certain adornments such as lip plugs, gold armbands, and cotton cloaks.

At the start of Tlacaelel's tenure, the Mexica were vassals. By the end, they had become the Aztecs, rulers of a socially stratified and expansionistic empire.

=== The reigns of Axayacatl 1469–1481 and Tizoc 1481–1486 ===
Moctezuma I's son, Axayacatl, ascended to the throne in 1469. During his reign, Tenochtitlan absorbed the kingdom of Tlatelolco. Axayacatl's sister was married to the tlatoani of Tlatelolco, and, as a pretext for war, Axayacatl declared that she was mistreated.

He went on to conquer the Matlatzinca and Mazahua cities of Tollocan, Ocuillan, and Malinalco west of the Valley of Mexico.

At this point Tenochtitlan experienced a brief "civil war" when the small city of Tlatelolco, considered a part of Tenochtitlan by the Aztecs, rebelled under their Tlatoani Moquihuix, who sought to ally himself with the longstanding enemies of the Tenochca, the Chalca, Tlaxcalteca, Chololteca and Huexotzinca. The Tlatelolca were defeated and Axayacatl then ordered the execution of all the rulers who had aided him, including the ruler of Xochimilco.

Continuing campaigns in the west in 1479, he suffered an unprecedented defeat by the Purépechas at Tzintzuntzan. This was the Aztecs' first great defeat; once recovered he had to consolidate control of the Huasteca region which had already been conquered by his predecessor.

In 1481 Axayacatl's brother Tizoc ruled briefly, but his rule was marred by the humiliation he received in his coronation war: fighting the Otomies at Metztitlan he brought home only 40 prisoners for sacrifice at his coronation ceremony. After this defeat Tizoc had to fight principally to maintain control of the already conquered territories, and failing to subdue new towns he was replaced, possibly poisoned, by his younger brother Ahuitzotl.

=== The reign of Moctezuma II Xocoyotzin ===
At the coronation of the Moctezuma II in 1502, a Psilocybe mushroom species known to the Aztecs as teōnanācatl (agglutinative form of teōtl (god, sacred) and nanācatl (mushroom) in Náhuatl) was reportedly served. Moctezuma II was, although many sources depict him otherwise, a notable warrior who extended the tributary system, and consolidated the conquests made by his predecessors as well as conquering new territories. His campaigns reached as far south as Tapachula in the Soconusco region and the Chontal Maya states of Xicallanco in Tabasco. Only the Aztec archenemies of Tlaxcala, Huexotzinco, and the Purépecha remained undefeated, as well as the Mixtec kingdoms of Tututepec and Yopitzinco which did not interest the Aztecs. Thus the Aztec Empire had its largest geographical extent when the Spaniards arrived in 1519. Some sources claim that Moctezuma II, and the Aztecs, believed the arriving Spanish to be linked to the supposed return of an exiled god, Quetzlcoatl, who was supposed to return pale and bearded.

== Fall of the Aztec Empire ==
The Aztecs were conquered by Spain in 1521 after a long siege of the capital, Tenochtitlan, where much of the population died from hunger and smallpox. Cortés, with 508 Spaniards, did not fight alone but with as many as 150,000 or 200,000 allies from Tlaxcala, and eventually other Aztec tributary states. It was not difficult for Cortés to find allies to fight with him, the Aztecs were not generally liked by the neighboring city-states. Cuauhtémoc, the last Hueyi Tlatoani surrendered to Cortés on August 13, 1521.

It took nearly another 60 years of war before the Spaniards completed the conquest of Mesoamerica (the Chichimeca War), a process that could have taken longer were it not for three separate epidemics, including a rare strain of paratyphoid fever, that took a heavy toll on the remaining Native American population. The Spanish conquest of Yucatán took almost 170 years.

As allies of the Spaniards, the Tlaxcalans gained the most. The Spaniards would eventually break the alliance, but not until decades later.

== See also ==
- Aztec Empire
- Aztec use of entheogens
- Women in Aztec civilization
- Spanish conquest of the Aztec Empire
- Index — Aztec history
