= Yacotzin =

Yacotzin (fl. ca. early 16th century) was the wife of Nezahualpilli, king of Texcoco and mother of Ixtlilxochitl II. According to the Ramírez Codex, she initially disapproved of the conversion of her son, Ixtlilxochitl II, to Christianity. Hernán Cortés stated that he would execute her, if she was not the mother to the prince. The prince stated that he would receive the sacrament, regardless of his mother's approval. Ixtlilxochitl then ordered for the rooms of Yacotzin to be set on fire. Other stories state that that Yacotzin was found in a temple of idolatry. She later decided to convert to Christianity. She was baptized, along with her four daughters. Upon finding out she had been unfaithful to him, Nezahualpilli had her publicly executed.
