= Ixtlilxochitl I =

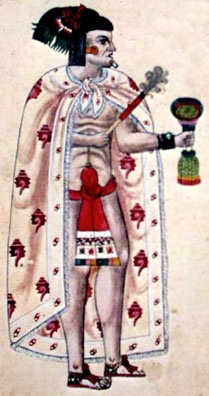
- Ixtlilxochitl I in the Codex Ixtlilxochitl folio 107 recto

Tlatoani of Texcoco
- Reign: 1409 – 1418
- Predecessor: Techotlalatzin
- Successor: Nezahualcoyotl
- Died: 1418
- Spouse: Matlalcihuatzin
- Issue: Nezahualcoyotl
- Father: Techotlalatzin

Ixtlilxochitl Ome Tochtli (c. 1380–1418) was the ruler (tlatoani) of the Acolhua city-state of Texcoco from 1409 to 1418 and the father of the famous "poet-king" Nezahualcoyotl.

== Early years as tlatoani ==
Claiming descent from the legendary Chichimec chieftains King Xolotl and Nopaltzin, Ixtlilxochitl became tlatoani of Texcoco in 1409 after the death of his father, Techotlala. For several years thereafter, Ixtlilxochitl continued to pay tribute to the powerful Tepanec city of Azcapotzalco and its tlatoani Tezozomoc. However, Ixtlilxochitl grew restive in this role and, in preference to Tezozomoc's daughter, married the Mexica princess Matlalcihuatzin, a daughter of Huitzilihuitl, tlatoani of Tenochtitlan.

In 1414, Ixtlilxochitl took the title Chichimeca Tecuhtli ("Lord of the Chichimecs") and urged the Mexica to ally with him against Azcapotzalco. However, Huitzilihuitl, perhaps in deference to his wife, Tezozomoc's daughter, maintained his support of Tezozomoc and Azcapotzalco.

== Tezozomoc attacks ==
In response to Ixtlilxochitl's defiance, Tezozomoc led a large army, including Mexica forces, against Texcoco. Despite some initial successes, Tezozomoc was repulsed. Ixtlilxochitl reacted to this victory by taking the battle to Azcapotzalco, and besieged it for several months. Unable to take the city, however, Ixtlilxochitl lifted the siege, and returned to Texcoco.

The following year, the Tepanec forces, including Mexica contingents, again laid siege to Texcoco this time driving out Ixtlilxochitl, who was finally cornered in the foothills of Mount Tlaloc. His young son Nezahualcoyotl witnessed his death from the branches of a nearby tree.

Texcoco was awarded to Tenochtitlan as a tributary, and Nezahualcoyotl fled into exile in Huexotzingo. Ten years later Nezahualcoyotl would avenge his father's death and retake Texcoco with the help of Itzcoatl, the future tlatoani of Tenochtitlan.

| Preceded by Techotlalatzin | Tlatoani of Texcoco; 1409–1418 | Succeeded by Nezahualcoyotl |
