= Coanacoch =

Last tlatoani of Texcoco

Coanacochtzin

Tlatoani of Texcoco
- Reign: 1520–1521
- Predecessor: Cacamatzin
- Successor: Tecocoltzin
- Died: 1524
- Father: Nezahualpilli

Coanacochtzin (died 1525) was the last tlatoani (ruler) of Texcoco before the city came under Spanish control.

One of Nezahualpilli's sons, he succeeded to throne after the death of his half-brother Cacama in 1520. When the forces under Hernán Cortés approached Texcoco during their conquest of the Aztec Empire, Coanacoch fled to Tenochtitlan. In his place, Cortés appointed his Spain-aligned brother Tecocoltzin as tlatoani of Texcoco.

Coanacoch assisted Cuauhtémoc at the Fall of Tenochtitlan in defending the city and was captured after its fall. He was executed by Cortés in 1524.

Preceded by Cacama	Tlatoani of Texcoco; 1520–1521	Succeeded by Tecocoltzin
