= Cacamatzin =

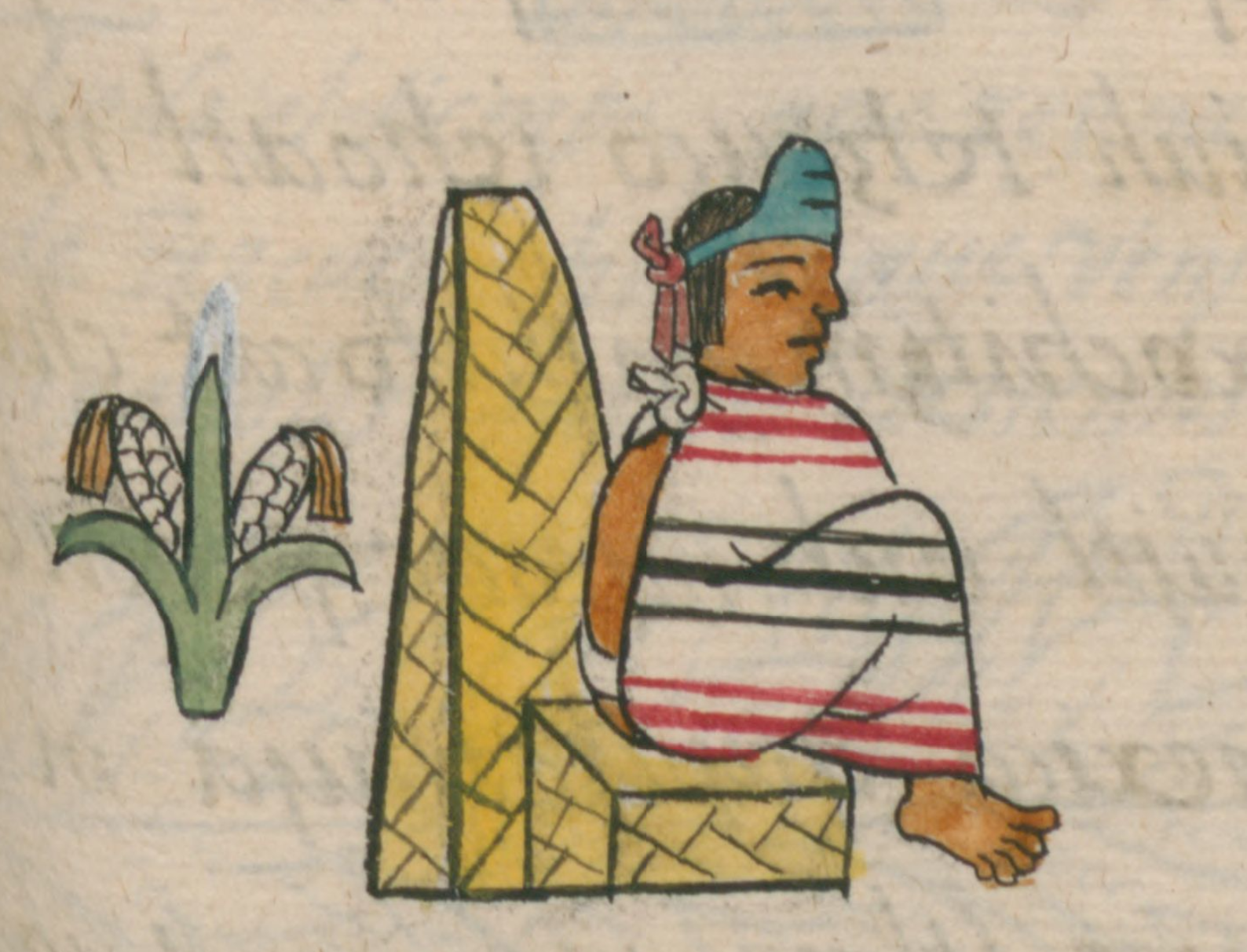
- Cacamatzin as depicted in a 16th-century manuscript

Tlatoani of Texcoco
- Reign: 1515 – 1520
- Predecessor: Nezahualpilli
- Successor: Coanacochtzin
- Born: c. 1483
- Died: 1520
- Father: Nezahualpilli

Cacamatzin (or Cacama) (c. 1483–1520) was the tlatoani (ruler) of Texcoco, the second most important city of the Aztec Empire.

Cacamatzin was a son of the previous king Nezahualpilli by one of his mistresses. Traditionally, the Texcocan kings were elected by the nobility from the most able of the royal family. Cacamatzin's election to the throne in 1515 was said to have been made under considerable pressure from Moctezuma II, lord of Tenochtitlán. Moctezuma II wished to lessen Texcoco's power in favor of greater centralization in Tenochtitlán.

Cacamatzin wrote Cacamatzin Icuic ("Song of Cacamatzin"), invoking his father and grandfather; he seems to protest against Pedro de Alvarado's attack during the festival of Tóxcatl.

Moctezuma II, under orders from Cortés, had Cacamatzin arrested "in his own palace while discussing war-preparations". The Caciques of Coyoacan, Iztapalapa, and Tacuba were also arrested.

Cacamatzin died during the retreat of Spanish conquistador Hernán Cortés, on La Noche Triste.

== Rebellion ==
While staying in the Axayácatl palace, the Spaniards discovered the room where the treasures of Moctezuma's grandfather were found. Cortés asked the huey tlatoani about the places where the gold came from. After the answer, expeditions were organized to the regions of Zacatula, Pánuco and Coatzacoalcos; Cortés also demanded that Moctezuma ask all his vassals to immediately pay all available gold. Tetlahuehuezquititzin and Netzahualquentzin, both Cacamatzin's brothers, were responsible in Tetzcuco for delivering the gold to the Spanish. Due to a misunderstanding, a probable treason on the part of Netzahualquentzin was suspected, he was arrested and taken in front of Cortés who sentenced him to hang, but Moctezuma interceded and the sentence was suspended, however Netzahualquentzin had been flogged.

Exacerbated by events, Cacamatzin summoned his vassals, his cousin and lord of Coyoacán, as well as the tlatoani of Tlacopan Totoquihuatzin, the lord of Iztapalapa Cuitláhuac, and the lord of Matlatzinco, to rebel against the Spanish conquerors. However, Moctezuma, enraptured by the Europeans, and not wanting to see Tenochtitlan under war, alerted Cortés, who tried to make peace with the Lord of Tetzcuco. Cacamatzin's answer was negative, he even argued that he did not believe his lies and that he would not be convinced as the huey tlatoani had been.

Moctezuma, through messengers, interceded in favor of Cortés and ordered Cacamatzin to be asked once again not to attempt rebellion against the Spanish. In response, the Lord of Tetzcuco gave an ultimatum of four days, adding that his uncle was a chicken, he begged Moctezuma to let go, to be a lord and not a slave, he told Cortés that he had no friendship with whoever took him away. honor and kingdom, and that the war he wanted to wage was for the benefit of his vassals in defense of their land and religion.

Preceded by Nezahualpilli	Tlatoani of Texcoco; 1515–1520	Succeeded by Coanacochtzin
