= Acolhuacan =

The Aztec glyph for Acolhuacan, which depicts an arm with water emerging from the humerus.

Acolhuacan or Aculhuacan (Nahuatl: ācōlhuahcān; pronounced [aːkoːlˈwaʔkaːn]) was a pre-Columbian province in the east of the Valley of Mexico, inhabited by the Acolhua. Its capital was initially Coatlichan, but this settlement was eventually eclipsed in importance by Texcoco (Tetzcoco).

In some sources, the name "Acolhuacan" was also used to refer to a city within the larger Acolhuacan province (e.g., in the Codex Mendoza, folio 21v). Frances Berdan and Patricia Rieff Anawalt argue that it was likely Texcoco, Acolman, or Coatlichan, with the latter two being "the most likely prospects." Additional scholars largely agree that Acolhuacan was likely another name for Coatlichan.
