= Texcotzingo =

Aztec garden in Mexico

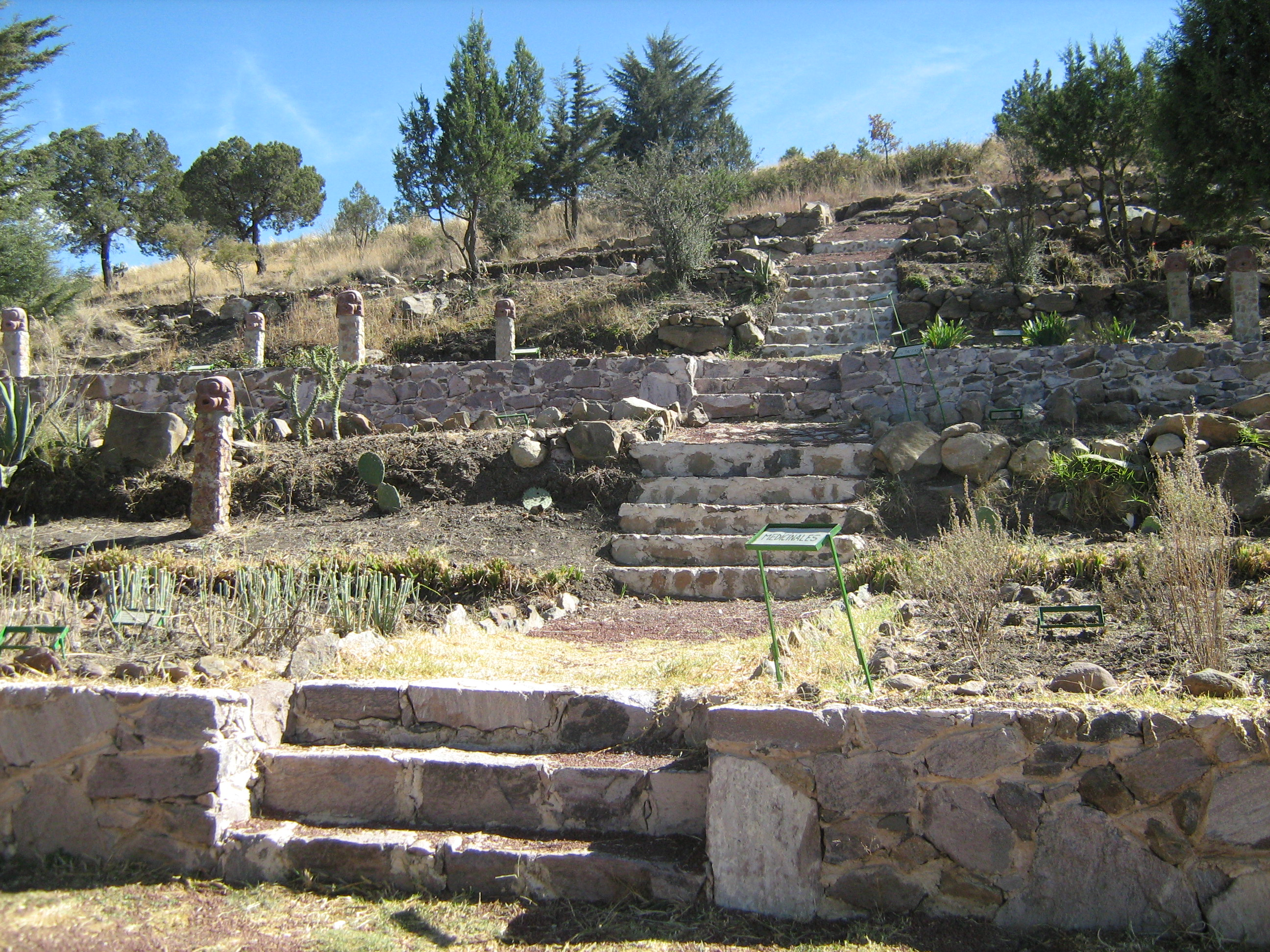

- Location within Mexico
- 19°29′49″N 98°49′06″W
- Location: Oaxtepec

History
- Built by: Nezahualcoyotl

Texcotzingo (alternatively, Tetzcotzingo) is claimed to be one of the first extant botanical gardens in the world, along with Moctezuma's gardens in Huastepec. The gardens and archaeological site are located roughly 20 miles northeast of central Mexico City, Mexico.

Texcotzingo is adjacent to the Aztec capital city of Texcoco and acted as the summer imperial gardens, resplendent in all the royal trappings of the time, including imperial and courtly residences and fantastic waterworks. Tetzcotzingo, however, should also be seen as a hedonist/sacred space, agricultural space, political statement or emblem, performance space, and earthworks.

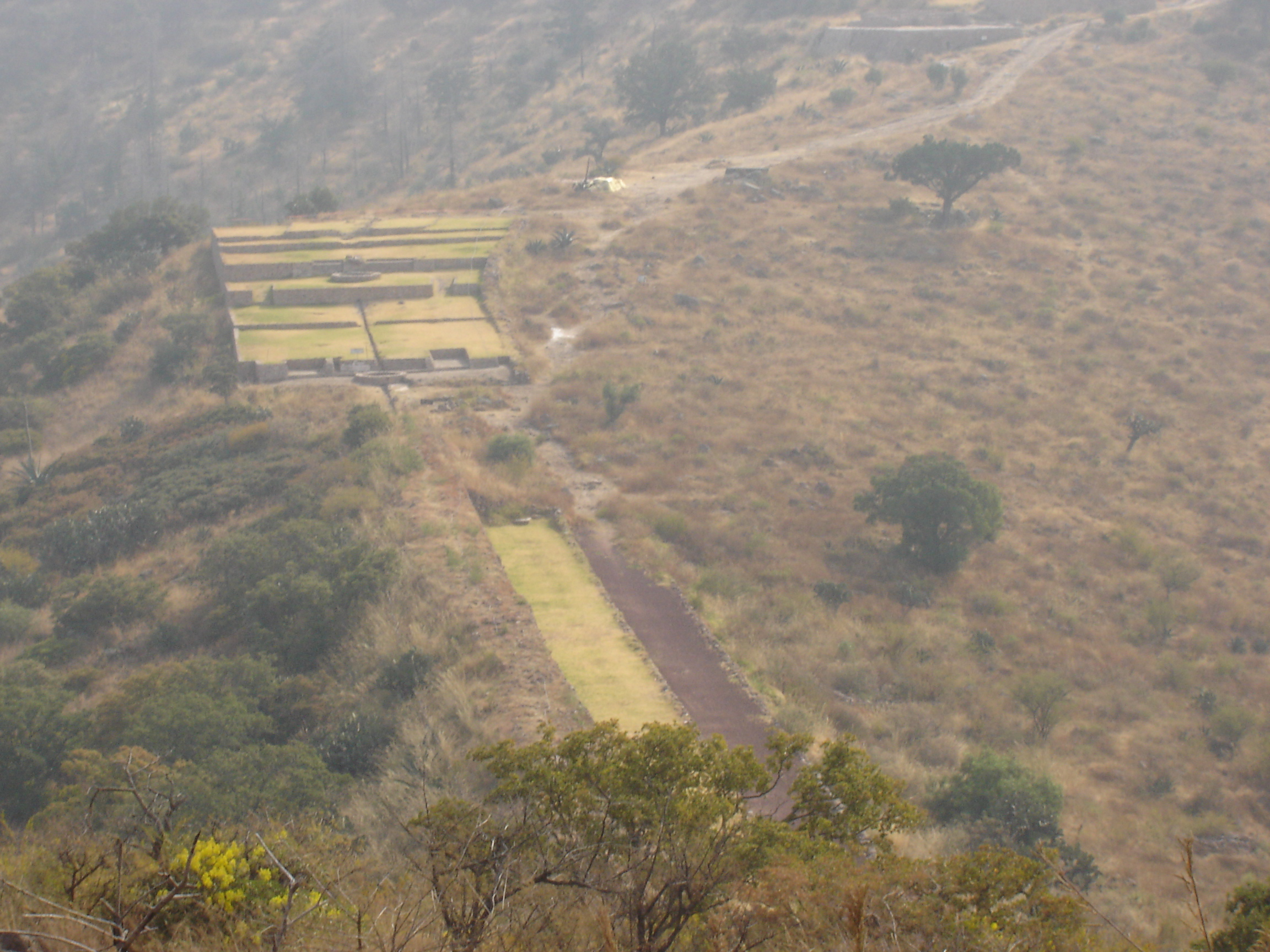
View from the second level

== History ==
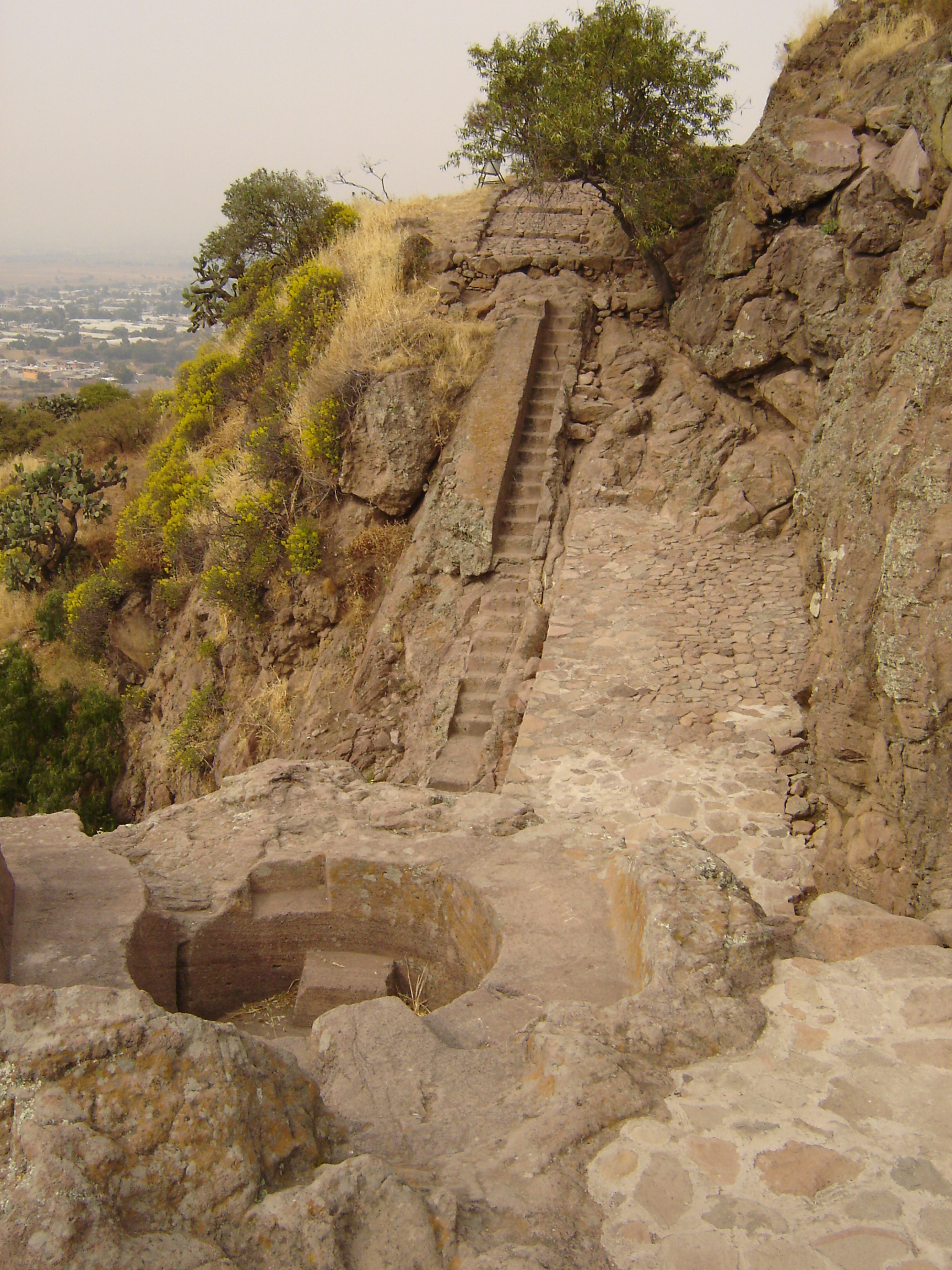
Structure known as "el Baño del Rey"

Texcotzingo was designed and created by Nezahualcoyotl, the then-ruler of Texcoco, in the 15th century. These imperial gardens were used to collect and display plant and animal specimens, aiming towards an encyclopedic understanding of the flora and fauna of the whole of the Aztec empire, as well as the cultivation of medicinal plants. They were conceived as a place for sensual gratification on one hand and as a recreation of paradise on the other. Dedicated to the rain god Tlaloc, (He Who Makes the Plants Spring Up), Texcotzingo was designed by incorporating Aztec myths through sculpture depicting gods and observances of sacred numbers (such as the number 52).

New hydraulic projects and terrace gardens transformed the previously un-arable land into lush edible gardens containing the three ubiquitous staples of the Americas: maize, beans, and squash. Waterways were also used to connect pools imbued with historical and mythical significance through monolithic sculptures and symbolic representations, therefore reasserting the Aztec's empire connection to mythic cosmographies and preceding empires. One clear example is a bath/pool flanked by three frogs representing the three city states of Tenochitlan, Texcoco, and Tlacopan, the cities which made up the Aztec Triple Alliance. The baths in the Texcotzingo site were carved from solid rock and were surrounded by lush gardens and waterworks.

Aesthetic manifestations of practiced myths, vital to Aztec culture, also occupied an important place at Texcotzingo, with spaces designed for the performance of poetry, singing, dancing and oration. This transformation of the mountain of Texcotzingo into art, and the perception that the mountain itself was art, in that it held special significance (mythical or otherwise) in pre-Columbian culture, classifies Texcotzingo as an earthwork. There is also a tangible connection between the ideas of art, culture and nature manifested in rocks and sculptures, existing flora and plantings, etc. in the design of Texcotzingo.
