= Nezahualpilli =

Nezahualpilli I
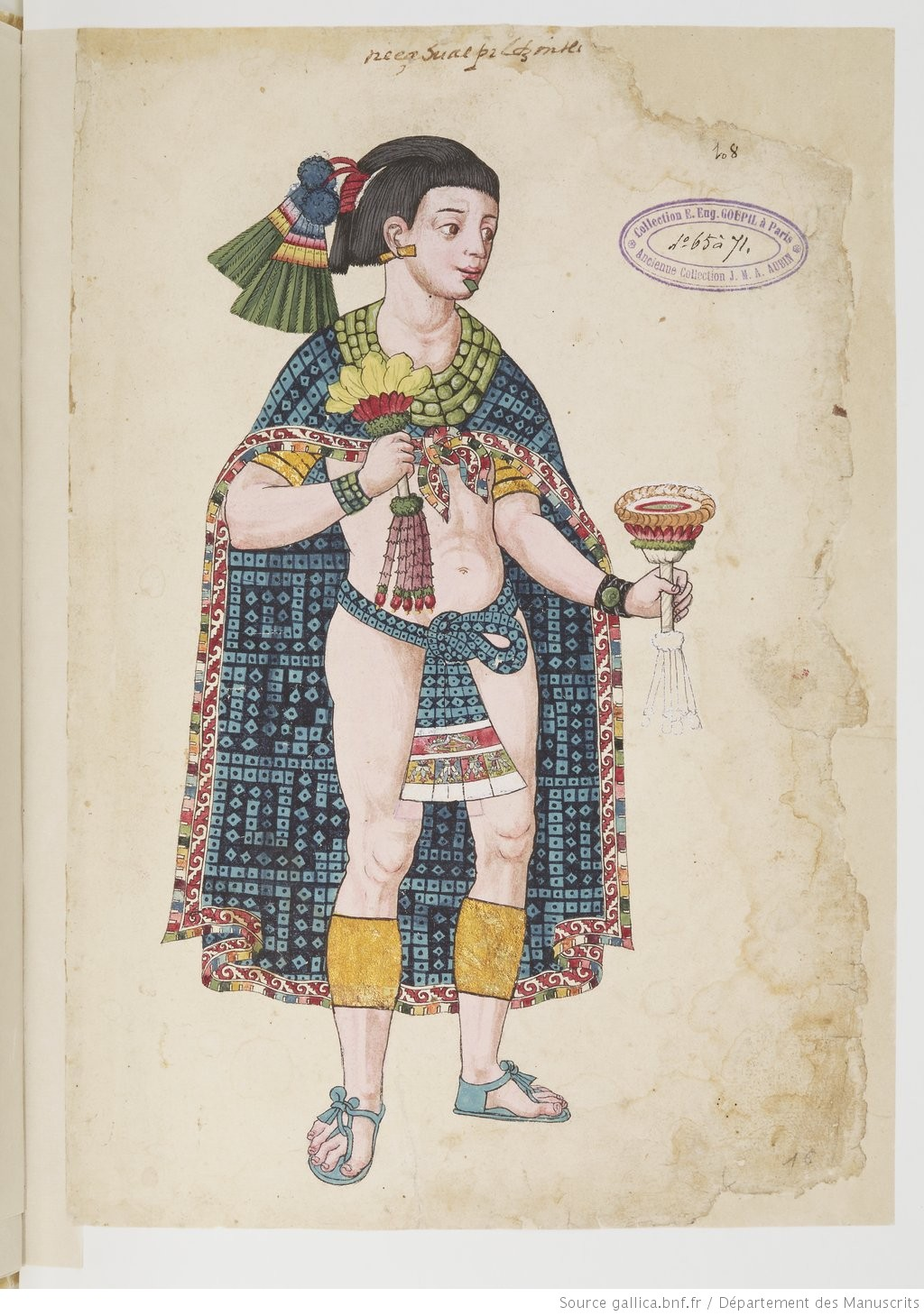
- A non-contemporary depiction of Nezahualpilli from the Codex Ixtlilxochitl.

Tlatoani of Texcoco
- Reign: 1473–1515
- Predecessor: Nezahualcoyotl
- Successor: Cacama
- Born: 1464
- Died: 1515 (aged 50–51)
- Spouse: Yacotzin
- Issue: Cacama; Ixtlilxochitl II; Many other children
- Father: Nezahualcoyotl
- Mother: Azcalxochitzin

Nezahualpilli (Nahuatl for "fasting prince"; 1464–1515, modern Nahuatl pronunciation) was king (tlatoani) of the Mesoamerican city-state of Texcoco, elected by the city's nobility after the death of his father, Nezahualcoyotl, in 1472. Nezahuapilli's mother was Azcalxochitzin, who married Nezahualcoyotl after the death of her first husband, King Cuahcuauhtzin of Tepechpan.

Like his father, he was a poet, was considered a sage, and had the reputation of being a fair ruler. Only one of his poems survives: "Icuic Nezahualpilli yc tlamato huexotzinco" ("Song of Nezahualpilli during the war with Huexotzinco"). His court was a haven for astronomers, engineers, and soothsayers. During his reign, he abolished capital punishment for a number of crimes and struggled to keep the political independence of Texcoco during the increasing centralization of Aztec power in Tenochtitlán.

When he told Moctezuma II that the Texcocan wise men had foretold foreign dominion over the Valley of Mexico, the emperor challenged him to a ball game. Moctezuma considered the loss of the game a negative omen.

Nezahualpilli was said to have taken numerous consorts and fathered 144 children. He was succeeded by his son Cacama.

== Notes ==
Preceded by Nezahualcoyotl	Tlatoque of Texcoco; 1473–1515	Succeeded by Cacama
