= Techotlalatzin =

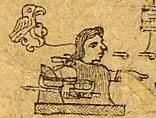
- Techotlalatzin from Codex Xolotl

Tlatoani of Texcoco
- Reign: 1357/1377 – 1409
- Predecessor: Quinatzin
- Successor: Ixtlilxochitl I
- Died: 1409
- Spouse: Tozquentzin
- Issue: Ixtlilxochitl I
- Father: Quinatzin

Techotlalatzin (or Techotlala, removing the Classical Nahuatl honorific -tzin) was the ruler (tlatoani) of the pre-Columbian Mesoamerican city-state of Texcoco from 1357 or 1377 until his death in 1409. Techotlalatzin was the first ruler of the Acolhua who actively adopted the prevailing culture of the Valley of Mexico, including the Nahuatl language.

The son of Quinatzin, Techotlalatzin was able to build a small Acolhua-dominated domain on the eastern side of Lake Texcoco, although this domain was apparently under the influence or even loose control of the Tepanec empire of his contemporary, Tezozomoc of Azcapotzalco.

Techotlalatzin married Tozquentzin, daughter of Acolmiztli of Coatlichan, and was succeeded by his son, Ixtlilxochitl I, who challenged the power of Tezozomoc and lost.

Early sources for Techotlalatzin include Fray Juan de Torquemada, Fernando de Alva Cortés Ixtlilxochitl, Juan Bautista de Pomar, and Codex Xolotl, although these sources at times present conflicting information (in fact, they are often internally inconsistent).

== Notes ==
Preceded by Quinatzin	Tlatoani of Texcoco; 1357? 1377?–1409	Succeeded by Ixtlilxochitl I
