= Tepetlaoztoc =

Coordinates: 19°34′23″N 98°49′13″W

Tepetlaoztoc or Tepetlaoxtoc (Nahuatl for 'tepetate-cave place', modern Nahuatl pronunciation) is an archaeological site located in the Central Mexico plateau region of Mesoamerica. It was an Aztec/Nahua settlement during the Late Postclassic period of Mesoamerican chronology, with an occupancy continuing through the Colonial period. The site is situated in the Valley of Mexico, to the northeast of Texcoco, in the municipality of Tepetlaoxtoc de Hidalgo.

In the 1970s, the area was relatively undeveloped, and one could, on aerial photographs, still discern the 16th century field lines and irrigation system drawn in the Codex of Santa María Asunción (manuscript in the Biblioteca Nacional) and the Codex Vergara. Likewise, one could locate many of the aldeas that were tributary to Tepetlaoztoc, and still find the wall bases of their houses. By the time of William T. Sanders's work in the 1990s, development had largely destroyed these remnants.
