= Coatlinchan =

Town in the Mexican state of Mexico

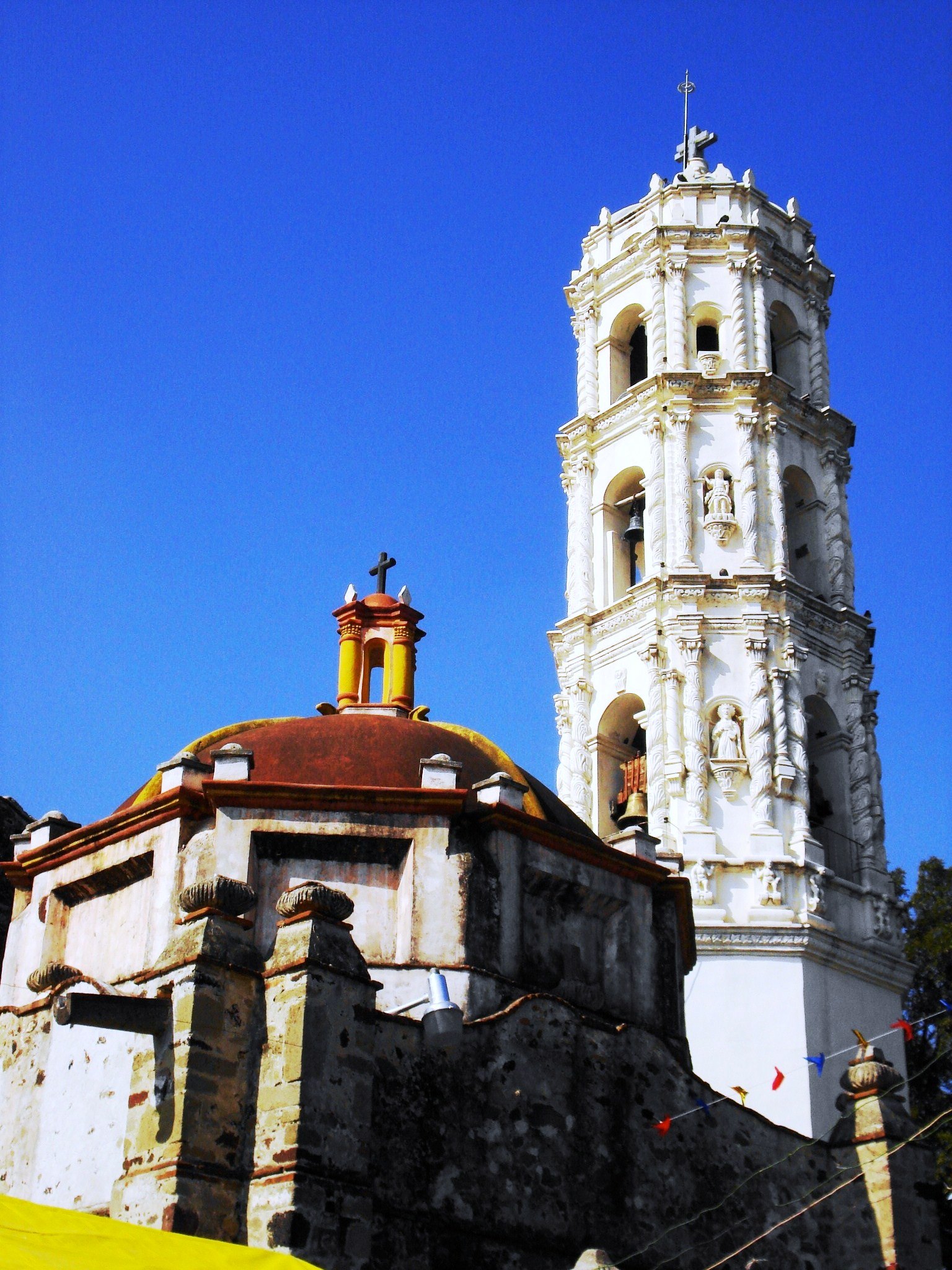

San Miguel Coatlinchán (Nahuatl: coatl + in- + chantli, meaning "snake" + possessive prefix + "home", or "in the home of the snakes") is a town in the State of Mexico, in the municipality of Texcoco. Nearby was the original location of the monolith of Tláloc, which is now located at the entrance of the National Museum of Anthropology in Mexico City.

== Location and demographics ==
San Miguel Coatlinchán is in the south of the municipality of Texcoco and about 5 kilometres (3.1 mi) south of the city of Texcoco de Mora, the municipal seat, in the transition zone between the Valley of Mexico and the foot of the Sierra Nevada. Elevation is dominated by the Sierra Quetzaltepec, from which descends the stream Coatlinchán through the Barranca of Santa Clara.

Its geographical coordinates are 19°26′56″N 98°52′20″W, and its altitude is approximately 2,300 metres (7,550 ft) above sea level. Its main route of communication is Federal Highway 136 (formerly the Mexico-Texcoco Highway), with which it is linked by two secondary branches; along the road are other communities of the municipality, including San Bernardino, Montecillo and Santiago Cuautlalpan.

According to the Population and Housing Census conducted by the National Institute of Statistics and Geography in 2010, the total population of San Miguel Coatlinchán was 22,619 people, of which 11,089 are men and 11,530 are women. This makes it the second most populated town in the municipality of Texcoco.

== History ==
The site of San Miguel Coatlinchán was originally inhabited by people of Chichimec origin in the pre-Hispanic era. Later the area was invaded by the Acolhuas, who established Coatlinchán as their capital until around 1337, when the capital was moved to Tetzcoco (present-day Texcoco).

=== Monolith of Tláloc ===
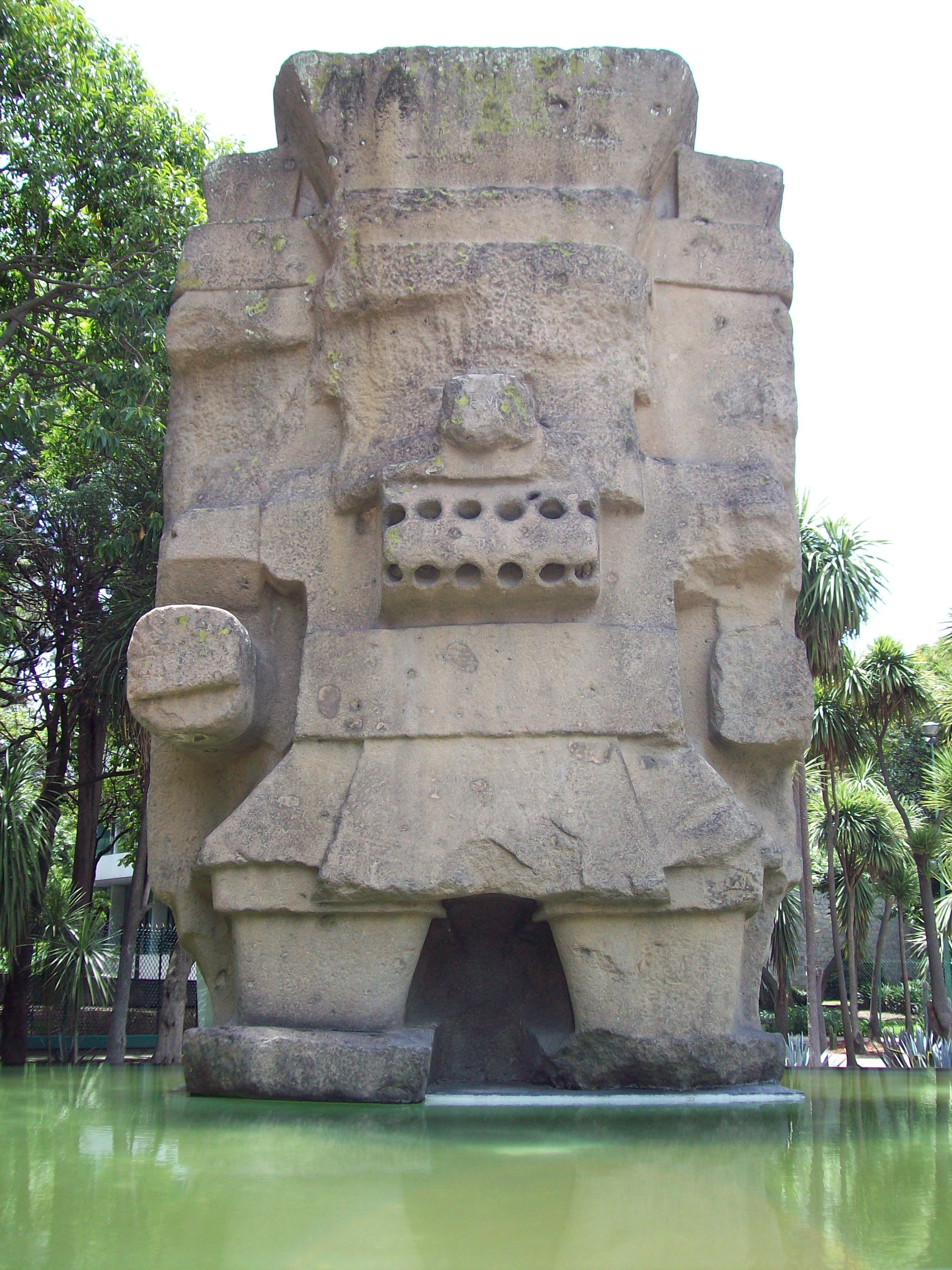
The Monolith of Tláloc where it stands today at the National Museum of Anthropology in Mexico City

The inhabitants of San Miguel Coatlinchán during this time were skilled in stoneworking and crafted a huge sculpture from stone that eventually made the town famous. This monument is known today as the Monolith of Tláloc. Different theories exist as to whether it represents Tláloc or his sister or wife Chalchiuhtlicue, both deities of water and rain in Mesoamerican cultures.

The monument remained buried from the time of the Spanish conquest until the mid-19th century, when a peasant gathering firewood unearthed part of it, and was later fully excavated. In 1889 the painter José María Velasco realized a painting of the monolith, identifying it as Chalchiuhtlicue. In 1903 the archaeologist Leopoldo Batres identified it as Tláloc. However, the population had long recognized the Piedra de los Tecomates, due to the circular crevices that the monument has in its center and which has the shape of a jicara or tecomate.

The population attributed to the sculpture various miraculous conditions, attributing to it the power to attract rain if the tecomates were wet, or healing powers to the water that accumulated in them. The people gave offerings to the sculpture and asked for sufficient rains and good harvests. In addition, the monument became a tourist attraction.

In 1963, the government of President Adolfo López Mateos, who was building the National Museum of Anthropology in Mexico City, expressed his intention to move the monolith from Santa Clara Canyon to the new museum. Consequently, the community held a formal assembly in May 1963 in which it accepted the donation of the sculpture to the museum in exchange for government funding for several public works, including paving the town's junction with the Mexico-Texcoco Highway and construction of a primary school for students up to the sixth grade, a health center, water wells and pumping equipment.

The work of relocating the monolith was delayed throughout 1963 and early 1964, during which time the population began to express their opposition to the transfer, mainly considering the costs of losing tourism that benefitted the local economy but also the belief that its absence would affect local rainfall levels.

With the transfer imminent, on February 23, 1964, many locals rebelled, destroying the structures built to move the monolith and deflating the tires of the trucks intended for the transfer. The government temporarily postponed the transfer, but on April 16 of the same year, it was supported by elements of the Mexican Army that occupied the town in order to prevent another protest.

== See also ==
- List of megalithic sites
