= Nopaltzin =

- Tlatoque of Chichimecas
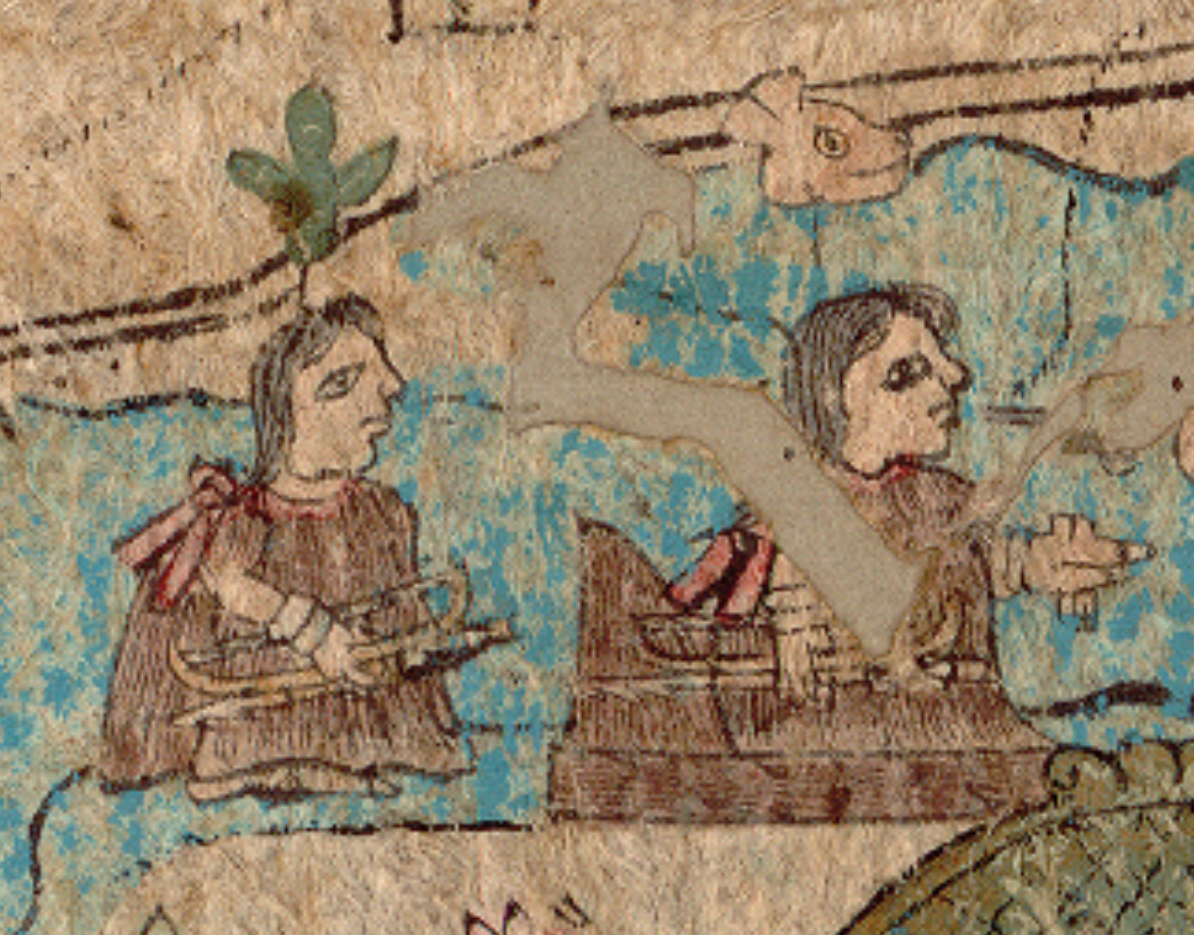
- Reign: c. 1204-1236
- Successor: Tlotzin Pochotl
- Died: c. 1236; Tenayocan
- Spouse: Princess Azcatl Xochitl of the Toltecs
- Issue: Tlotzin Pochotl
- Father: King Xolotl
- Mother: Chichimec Princess

Nopaltzin was a 13th-century Chichimec leader, a tlatoani. His name means "Cactus King" in the Nahuatl language.

A Chichimec ruler, the son of the celebrated King Xolotl and his wife, Nopaltzin assisted his father in founding the Chichimec capital, Tenayuca. He inherited the throne at the age of 60 in 1304 AD, and introduced Toltec culture to his people. Nopaltzin's son Tlotzin Pochotl, the "Hawk", continued his father's civilizing efforts.

Following the death of Xolotl, the kingdom was left to Nopaltzin, who took formal possession, by shooting four arrows, to the four winds, resolved to fix his residence in Tenayuca, within six miles of the Mexican lake, and to distribute his people upon the neighbouring lands.

The accession of Nopaltzin to the throne was celebrated with acclamations and rejoicings, for forty days. When the nobles took their leave to return to their respective states, one of them thus addressed the king:

"Great king and lord, as your subjects and servants, we go in obedience to your commands, to govern the people, you have committed to our charge, bearing in our hearts the pleasure of having seen you on the throne not less due to your virtue than to your birth. We acknowledge the good fortune unequalled, which we have in serving so illustrious and powerful a lord; and we request you to regard us with the eyes of a real father, and to protect us with your might, that we may rest secure under your shade. You are as well the water which restores, as the fire which destroys, and in your hands hold equally our life, and our death."

— The history of Ancient México

Nopaltzin was sixty years old when he ascended the throne, and was surrounded by his children and grandchildren. He conferred upon Tlotzin (Pochotl), the first born son of his Toltecan queen, the government of Tezcuco; and upon his two younger brothers, the states of Zacatlan and Tenamitic respectively, in order that they might betimes acquire the difficult art of ruling over men.
