= King Xolotl =

Xólotl
- Tlatoani of Chichimecas
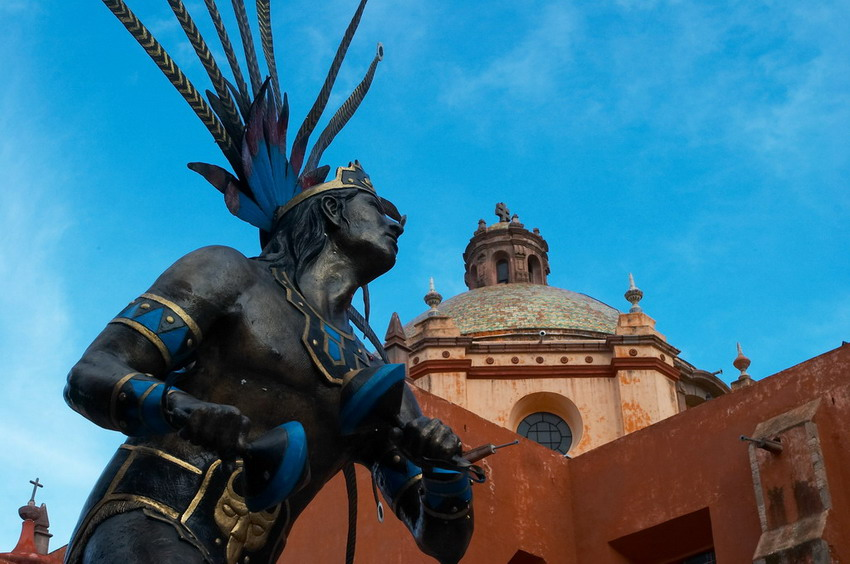
- Reign: c. 1157–1204
- Successor: Nopaltzin
- Born: c. 1130?
- Died: c. 1204; Tenayocan
- Issue: Queen Cuetlaxochitzin; King Nopaltzin

Xolotl (or Xólotl; Nahuatl pronunciation: [ˈʃolotɬ]) was a 13th-century Chichimec leader, a Tlatoani. He was named after the god Xolotl, an eventual Aztec god. Chichimeca is the name that the Nahua peoples of Mexico generically applied to a wide range of semi-nomadic peoples who inhabited the north of Mexico and the Southwestern United States.

Xolotl was said to have come from near the Huasteca, married to a princess of Tamiyauh and Panuco. From Chicomoztoc, he led his people to Tulancingo and Tula (finding it abandoned), before founding Tenayuca ca. 1224. Xolotl was succeeded by his son Nopaltzin who consolidated the Chichimec Kingdom. His daughter was Cuetlaxochitzin of Azcapotzalco, wife of the ruler Acolnahuacatl and mother of the famous Tezozomoc.

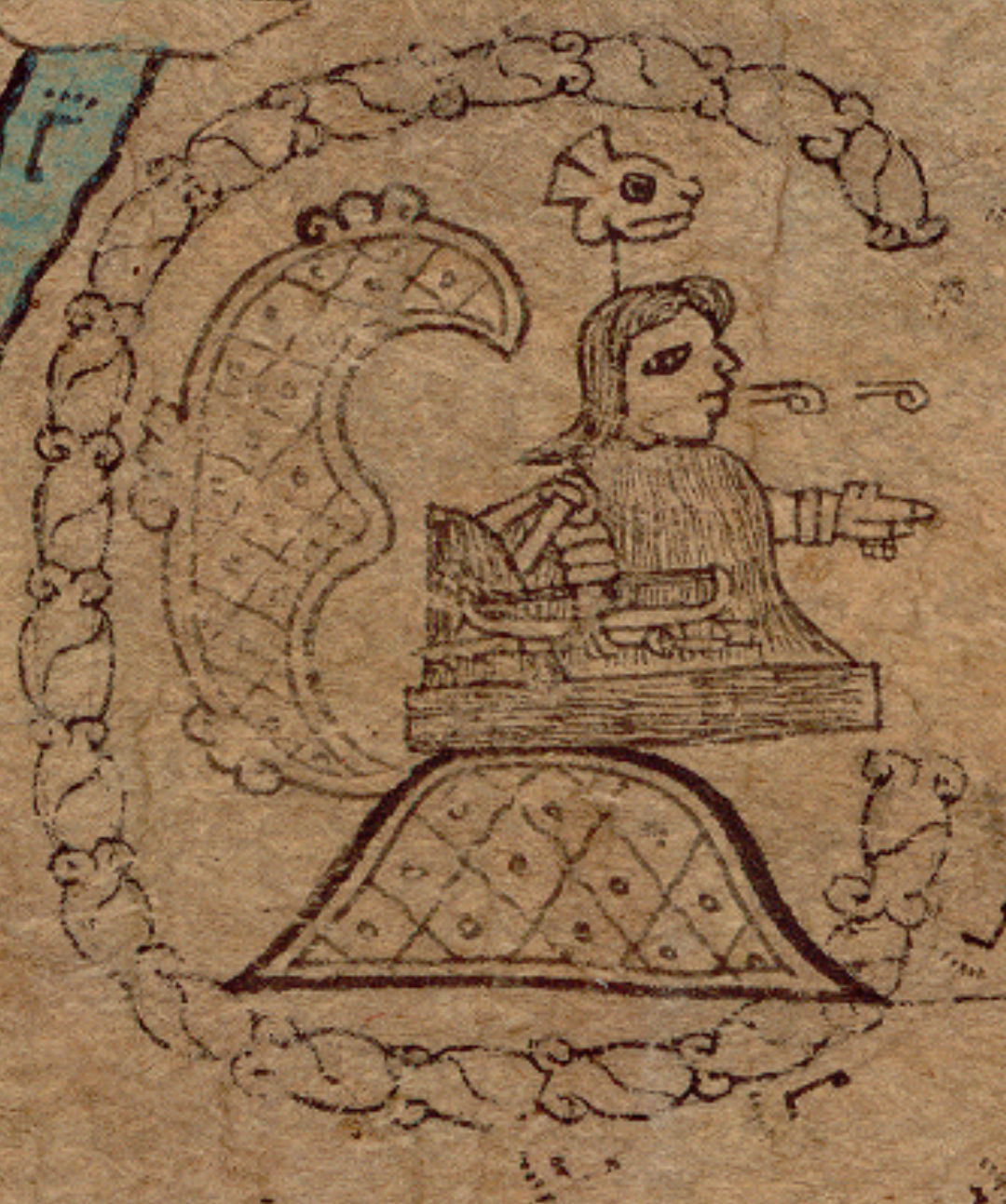
Xolotl in Tenayocan

Upon the death of the king, the nobles from every part of the country assembled, to render to the body, due funeral honours. The corpse was adorned with various small figures of gold and silver, and placed in a chair made of gum copal and other aromatic substances, where it remained for five days. After which it was burned, according to the custom of the Chichimecs, and the ashes gathered in an urn of the hardest stone; which were exposed for forty days in a hall of the royal mansion, where the nobility daily thronged to honour the memory of their sovereign. It was afterwards carried to a cave in the neighbourhood of the city, with loud demonstrations of grief.
