= Acolhua =

Mesoamerican people

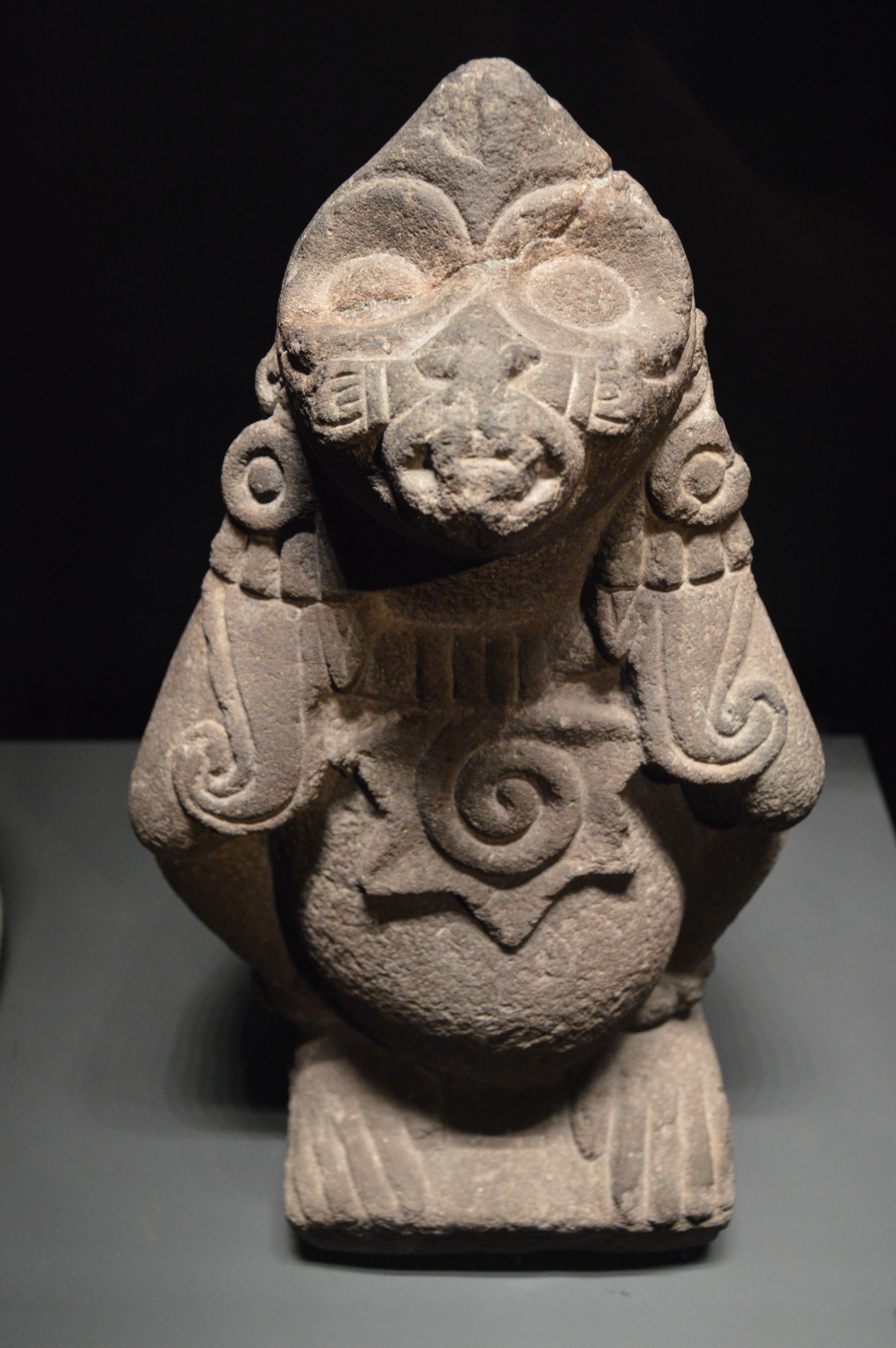
Ethécatl, the Acolhua God of Wind, Musée du quai Branly

The Acolhua are a Mesoamerican people who arrived in the Valley of Mexico in or around the year 1200 CE. The Acolhua are included under the term Aztec and were a sister culture of the Mexica as well as the Tepanec, Chalca, Xochimilca and others. The Acolhua settled most of the eastern Basin of Mexico, an area known as Acolhuacan. Their first capital was Coatlinchan, later moving to the more famous Tetzcoco. Another important Acolhua city was Huejotla.

According to Ixtlilxochitl, the Acolhua originated from the northwest beyond Michoacán, being similar to Chichimecs but having temples and idols. At this time, their patron deity was called Cocopitl. It is likely that the ruling family of the Acolhua were descended from Otomí speakers and did not speak Nahuatl until decreed by their ruler (tlatoani) Techotlalatzin.

The most important political entity in ancient Mesoamerica was the Triple Alliance (Nahuatl, excan tlatoloyan), founded in 1428 when the rulers of Tenochtitlan, Texcoco, and Tlacopan formed an alliance that replaced the Tepanec Empire of Azcapotzalco and eventually integrated into a single polity the most developed regions of western Mesoamerica. Because of the predominance of Tenochtitlan, it has also been called the Mexica, Aztec, or Tenochca Empire. It came to an end with the Spanish conquest of 1521.

Each of the three allied kings led a group of lesser kingdoms that coincided with the three major ethnic components and political powers of previous times: the Colhuas, the Acolhua-Chichimecs, and the Tepanecs. The domain of Tenochtitlan was the southern part of the Basin, with the Colhua towns of Xochimilco, and Cuitlahuac. Tetzcoco's domain comprised the Acolhua kingdoms in the eastern Basin and beyond to Tollantzinco and Cuauhchinanco. Tlacopan ruled the Tepanec towns of the western Basin, including Azcapotzalco and Coyoacán, and towns farther north to the Otomí center of Xilotepec.

These three allied groups of kingdoms constituted the core area of the empire, which as a unit then expanded its power over more distant areas.
