= Tetzcoco (altepetl) =

Pre-Columbian city-state

Coordinates: 19°31′46″N 98°53′48″W

- 1200–1521
- Glyph

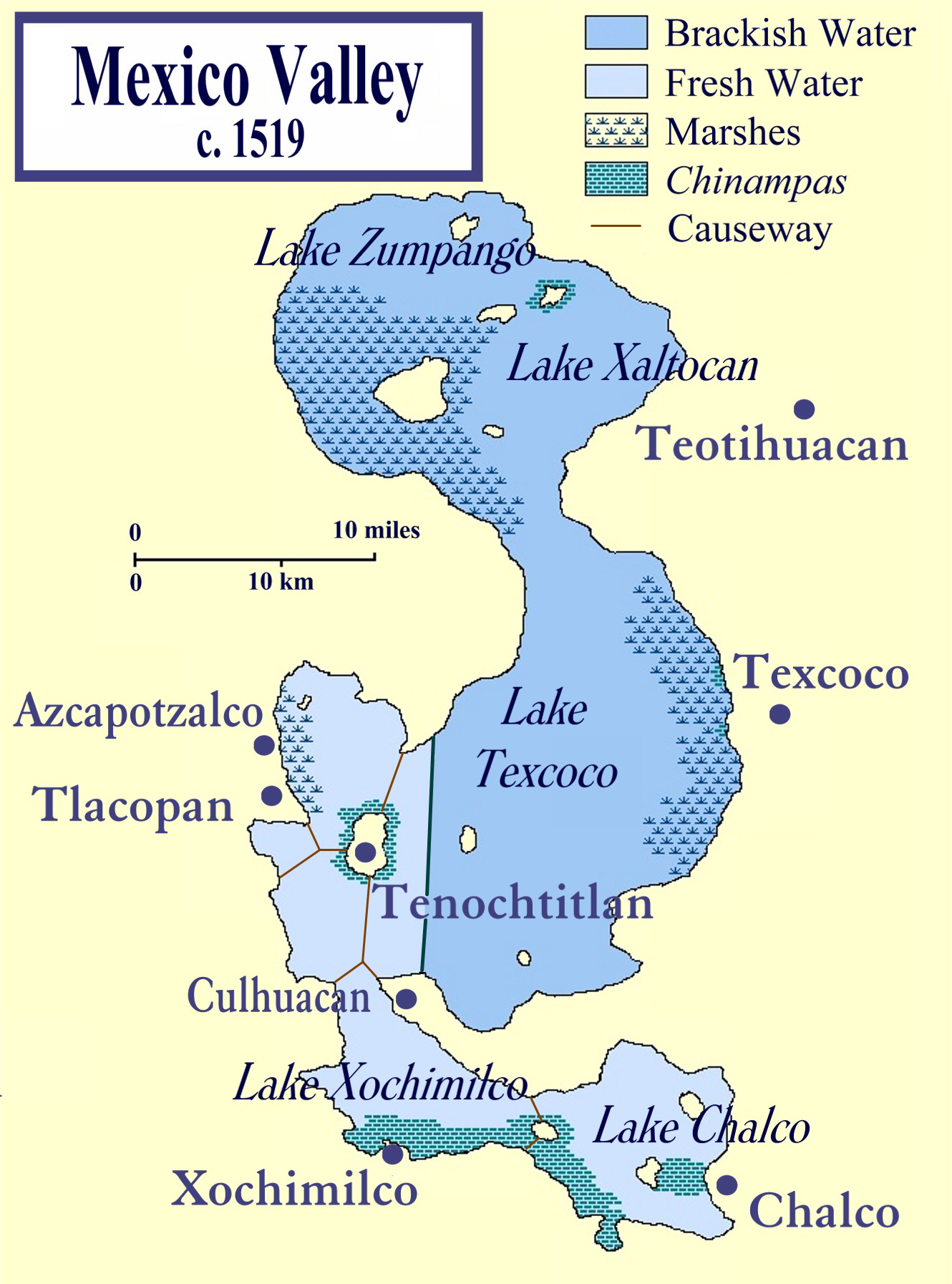
- The Valley of Mexico at the time of the Spanish conquest, showing Texcoco in relation to Tenochtitlan and other cities in the Valley of Mexico.
- Capital: Tetzcoco
- Common languages: Classical Nahuatl, Otomi
- Religion: Aztec religion, with Tezcatlipoca being the patron deity
- Government: Monarchy
- Historical era: Pre-Columbian
  - Established: 1200
  - Spanish conquest of the Aztec Empire: 1521

Population
  - pre-1521 estimate: 24,000
Succeeded by
New Spain

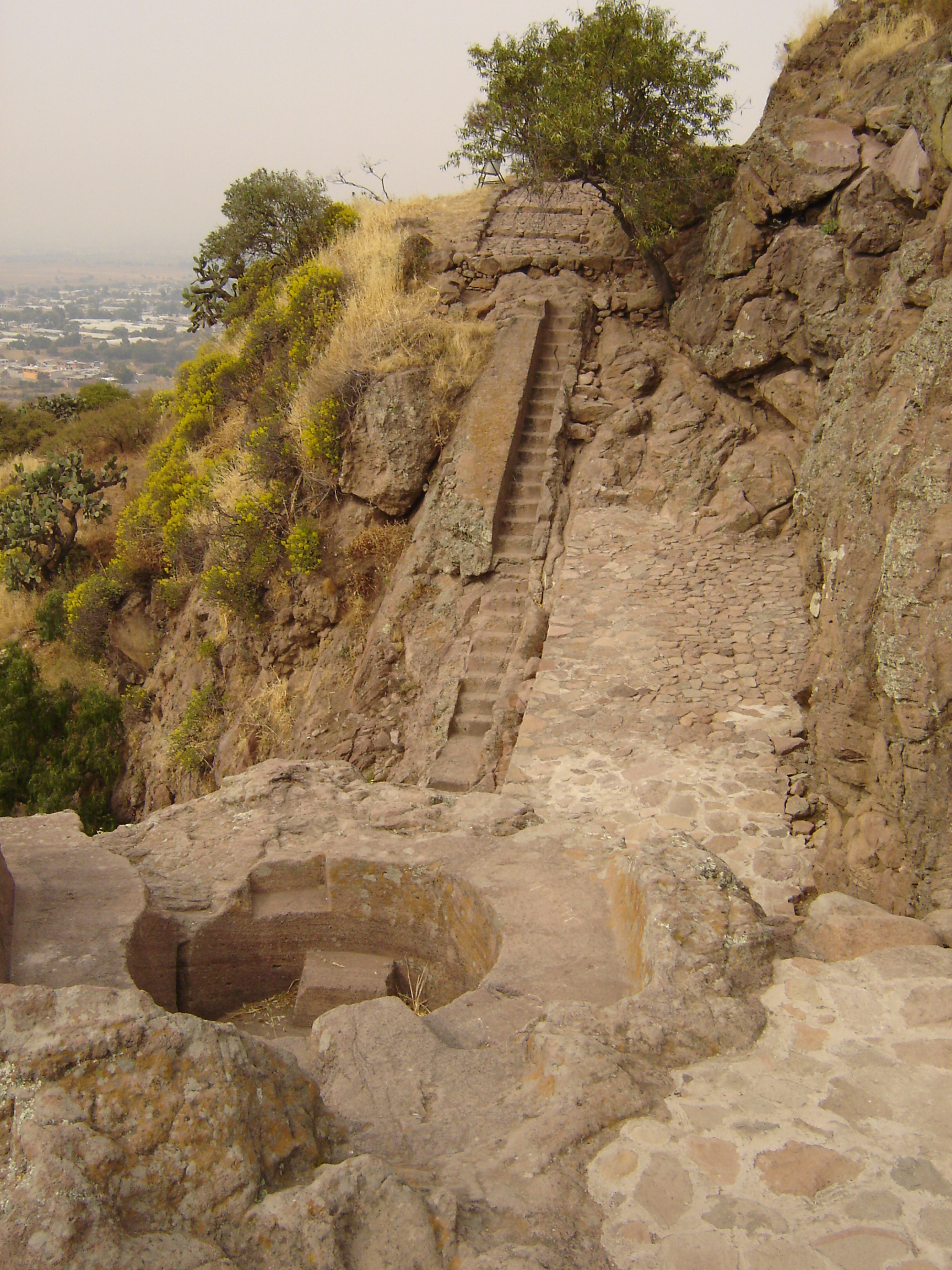
Tetzcotzingo Baths

Tetzcoco (Classical Nahuatl: Tetzco(h)co pronounced [tetsˈkoʔko], Otomi: Antamäwädehe) was a major Acolhua altepetl (city-state) in the central Mexican plateau region of Mesoamerica during the Late Postclassic period of pre-Columbian Mesoamerican chronology. It was situated on the eastern bank of Lake Texcoco in the Valley of Mexico, to the northeast of the Aztec capital, Tenochtitlan. The site of pre-Columbian Tetzcoco is now subsumed by the modern Mexican municipio of Texcoco and its major settlement, the city formally known as Texcoco de Mora. It also lies within the greater metropolitan area of Mexico City.

Pre-Columbian Tetzcoco is most noted for its membership in the Aztec Triple Alliance. At the time of the Spanish conquest of the Aztec Empire, it was one of the largest and most prestigious cities in central Mexico, second only to the Aztec capital, Tenochtitlan. A survey of Mesoamerican cities estimated that pre-conquest Tetzcoco had a population of 24,000+ and occupied an area of 450 hectares.

The people of Tetzcoco were called Tetzcocatl [tet͡sˈkokat͡ɬ] (singular) or Tetzcocah [tet͡sˈkokaʔ] (plural).

== History ==
Tetzcoco was founded in the 12th century, on the eastern shore of Lake Texcoco, probably by the Chichimecs. In or about 1337, the Acolhua, with Tepanec help, expelled Chichimecs from Tetzcoco and Tetzcoco became the Acolhua capital city, taking over that role from Coatlinchan.

In 1418, Ixtlilxochitl I, the tlatoani (ruler) of Tetzcoco, was dethroned by Tezozomoc of Azcapotzalco. Ten years later, in 1428, Ixtlilxochitl's son, Nezahualcoyotl allied with the Mexica to defeat Tezozomoc's son and successor, Maxtla. Tetzcoco and the Aztecs of Tenochtitlan, with the Tepanecs of Tlacopan, subsequently formalized their association as the Triple Alliance. However this was an uneven alliance as Tlacopan entered the battle against Azcapotzalco late. Tetzcoco thereby became the second-most important city in the eventual Aztec empire, by agreement receiving two-fifths of the tribute collected while Tlacopan received one-fifth.

Tetzcoco was known as a center of learning within the empire, and had a famed library including books from older Mesoamerican civilizations.

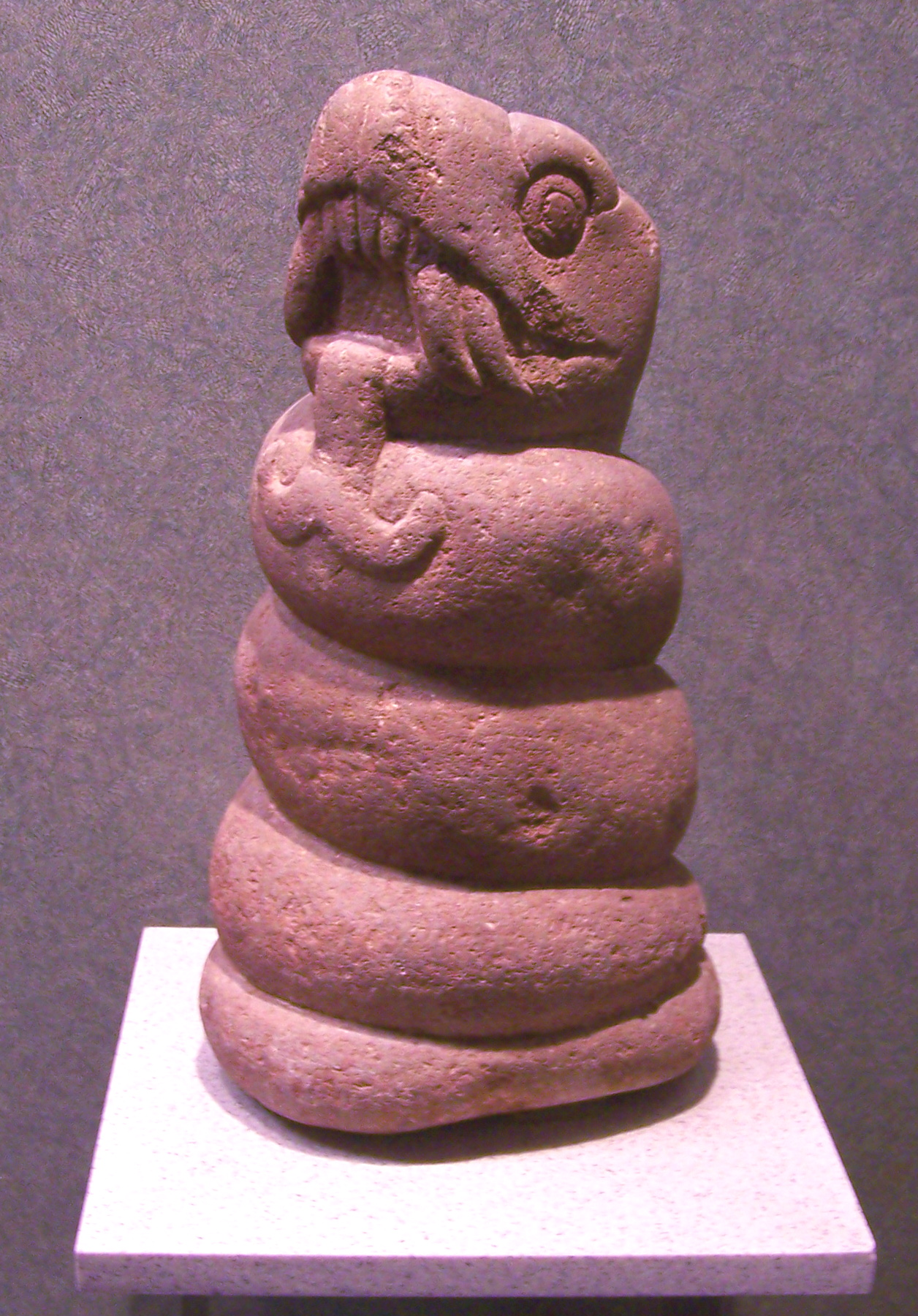
Greenstone sculpture of a snake, from the National Museum of Anthropology.

=== Palace, gardens and canal system ===
Erected by the hill of Tetzcotzingo, the royal residence had aqueducts, baths, gardens, stairways and over 300 separate chambers.

The palace gardens were a vast botanical collection that included plants from not only the growing Aztec Empire but also the most remote corners of Mesoamerica. Remnants of the gardens still exist to this day and have recently been studied by a team of Discovery Channel scientists, who were able to demonstrate by means of modeling and computer simulation that the layout of the site had been carefully planned to be in alignment with astronomical events, with an emphasis on Venus, and not simply aligned with the cardinal directions as previously assumed.

The water used to irrigate the gardens was obtained from the springs beyond the mountains to the east of Tetzcoco. The water was channeled through canals carved into the rock. In certain areas, rock staircases were used as waterfalls. After clearing the mountains, the canals continued downhill to a point a short distance from Tetzcotzingo. There the path to the city was blocked by a deep canyon that ran from north to south. Nezahualcoyotl ordered that the gap be filled with tons of rocks and stones, thus creating one of the major aqueducts in the New World.

=== Sacred hill ===
The whole hill of Tetzcotzingo was also served by this canal system and converted by his designers into a sacred place for the rain god Tláloc, complete with waterfalls, exotic animals and birds.

On the summit of the mountain he constructed a shrine to the god, laid out in hanging gardens reached by an airy flight of five hundred and twenty marble steps, a significant number, since according to Aztec mythology the gods have the opportunity to destroy humanity once every 52 years.

== Rulers of Tetzcoco ==
Xolotl was said to be the founder of Tetzcoco in 1115 AD and reigned until 1232. He was followed by Nopaltzin (1232–1263), Tlotzin (1263–1298), Quinatzin (1298–1357), Techotlalatzin (1357–1409), Ixlilxochitl (1409–1418), Nezahualcoyotl (1420–1472), Nezahualpilli (1472–1516), Cacama (1517–1519), Coanacochtzin (1520–1521), and Don Fernando Ixtlilxochitl (1521–1531).

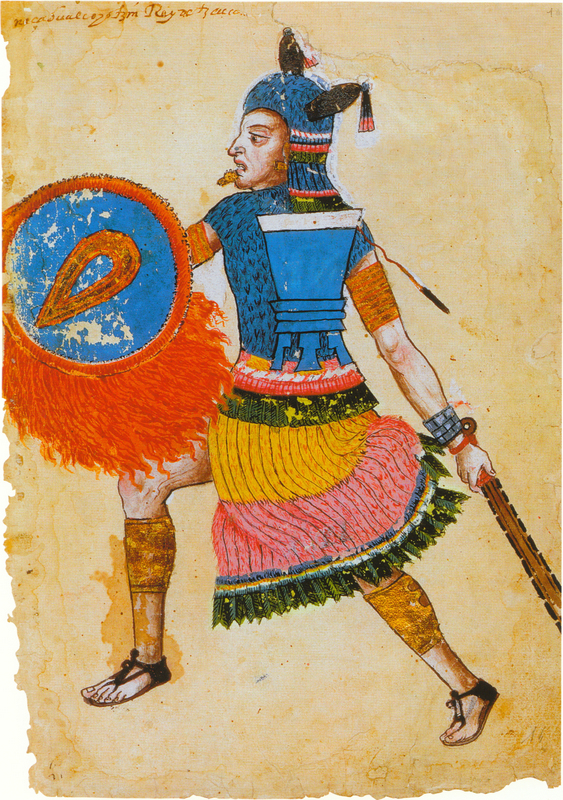
Nezahualcoyotl as shown in the Codex Ixtlilxochitl, folio 106R, painted roughly a century after Nezahualcoyotl's death.

Nezahualcoyotl (1403–1472) was a noted poet, philosopher, and patron of the arts. He also had a large botanical and zoological garden, with specimens of plants and animals from throughout the empire and from the more distant lands with which the Empire traded.

Nezahualcoyotl's son Nezahualpilli (1464–1515) continued the tradition of patronizing the arts.

In 1520 the troops of Hernán Cortés occupied the city and killed Cacamatzin, Nezahualpilli's son and the last independent tlatoani, installing Ixtlilxochitl II as a puppet ruler. Cortés made Tetzcoco his base and employed Tetzcocan warriors in the Siege of Tenochtitlan.

After the fall of Tenochtitlan, Spanish authorities continued to recognize the importance of Tetzcoco as a Spanish altepetl, designating it as one of four urban centers in the Valley of Mexico as a ciudad, "city," rebranding it "Texcoco." The Tetzcoca royal family continued to rule, handling succession to the throne in accordance with the traditional Aztec patterns of legitimacy. In this unique passage of kingship, cohorts of brothers inherited the right to rule, then sons of the next cohort, with claims to inheritance revolving around consanguinean ties to Mexica royalty from Tenochtitlan.

Alva Ixtlilxochitl, the immediate Tetzcoca heir after the Spanish-Aztec War, presided over colonial Texcoco as governor until his death in approximately 1550. Restall describes the political situation of Texcoco in the coming decades as follows:

"when Ixtlilxochitl died, he was succeeded by three of his brothers, don Jorge Yoyontzin (to 1533), don Pedro Tetlahuehuetzquititzin (to 1539), and don Antonio Pimentel Tlahuitolzin (to 1545); the latter's nephew (and a son of Coanacoch), don Hernando Pimentel Nezahualcoyotzin, would then rule as tlahtoani [king] and gobernador [governor] for two decades. Ixtlilxochitl's postwar rule thus ushered in a return of governmental stability, with the succession dispute and lethal warfare and lethal warfare of 1515-1521 a relatively short disruption to the otherwise calm dynastic century and a half from Nezahualcoyot through his great-grandson Pimentel. The dynasty would lose control of the city's top political office after that, but would persist as a landed aristocracy for centuries. Tetzcoco's decline as a regional power would likewise be very gradual, beginning at the end of the sixteenth century."

Concurrent with these politics was a mass outbreak of smallpox which ravaged Texcoco in the few months after the Spanish-Aztec War. This outbreak both shortened the tenures of Texcoco's last tlahtoanis and sent the city's population into freefall.

== Subsequent history ==
From 1827 to 1830, Texcoco served as the capital of the State of Mexico.
