= Codex Azcatitlan =

16th or 17th century Aztec pictorial manuscript

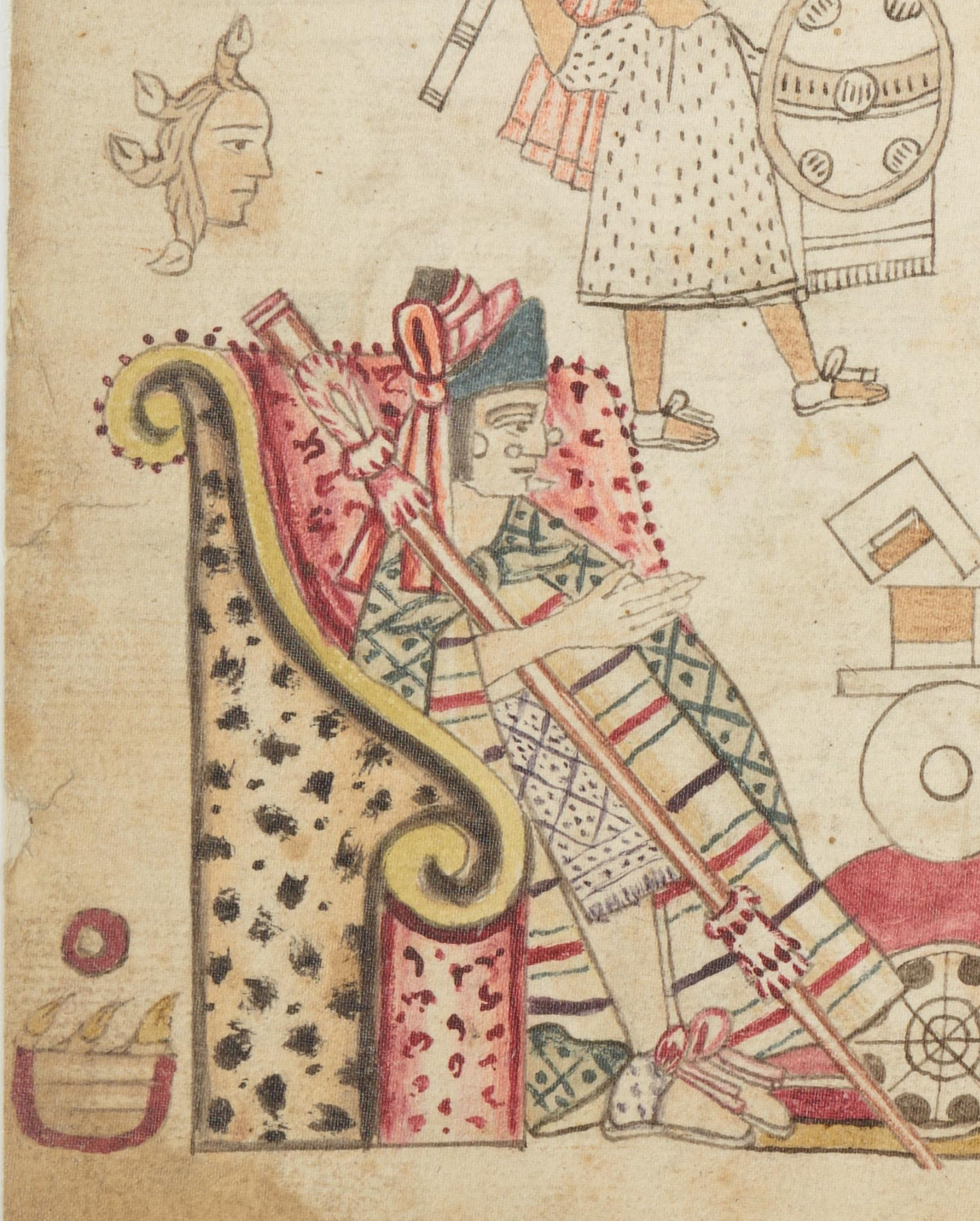
Axayacatl, sixth tlatoani of Tenochtitlan, as depicted in the Azcatitlan Codex

The Codex Azcatitlan is an Aztec codex detailing the history of the Mexica and their migration journey from Aztlán to the Spanish conquest of the Aztec Empire. The exact date when the codex was produced is unknown, but scholars speculate it was crafted some time between the mid-16th and 17th centuries. The name of this important Mexica pictorial manuscript was suggested by its first editor, Robert H. Barlow, who erroneously interpreted the anthill on page 2 as the glyph for “Aztlán.” In the Bibliothèque nationale de France, where it is housed, it is known as Histoire mexicaine, [Manuscrit] Mexicain 59–64.

== Characteristics ==
The style of the codex combines traditional Mesoamerican artisanry with European Renaissance technique. Mexican historian Federico Navarrete noted the use of European methods to depict the codex's content such as the use of three-dimensional objects. The master tlacuilo also uses overlapping images to create depth, as in European art. Figures in the codex also have a greater degree of movement than in prior manuscripts.

=== Manufacture ===
The codex's construction combines the pre-Columbian Aztec method of accordion-folding, but is bound in the two-page European style. Each of the 25 leaves, made of European paper, is about 21 centimeters (8.3 in) high and 28 centimeters (11 in) wide. The images within the codex flow across the surface of the pages until it runs out of space. In that event, the last image of the set is recreated exactly for the first image of the succeeding set. Inconsistencies in that flow seem to indicate that some of the pages are missing. The manuscript is also incomplete; color is sporadically used, and there are still draft lines and empty spaces.

This codex has two authors, or tlacuiloque, a master and an apprentice. The master laid out the entire narrative and then painted the more difficult and more important portions of the codex. The master observes Mesoamerican custom, most identifiable in his human figures, nearly always shown in profile, with angular faces looking to the right. The apprentice's figures, by contrast, use more curved lines and shadowing to better define the human body. He draws faces in profile until folio 9r, where a character looks directly at the observer. The master used bold and complete lines and coloration for his figures and glyphs.

One or both of the tlaquiloque may have known Antonio Valeriano, the pro-Tlateloco Governor of Tenochtitlan from 1573 to 1599. They may have also studied at the Colegio de Santa Cruz de Tlatelolco.

It appears that the master tlacuilo drew each set of specific year glyphs (Reed, Flint, House, Rabbit) in one session. This is alluded to by consistencies in form and inconsistencies in color by set. Once these were painted, he added the corresponding years in the Julian calendar, which in their forms resemble the glosses added to the codex later.

The first instances of work by the apprentice tlacuilo are found on folio 6v, as there appear houses shaded as per his method. He takes over completely until folio 12r, when the Mexica arrive at Tenochtitlan.

== History ==
It is not known when the manuscript was created, or whether it was first painted and then bound, or vice versa. Historian María Castañeda de la Paz has proposed the second half of the 16th century as the window of time in which Codex Azcatitlan was authored. The writing of the glosses in Nahuatl suggests a date in the last third of the sixteenth century, but the glosses may not be contemporary with the drawings, since the glossarist did not always understand them correctly.

At some point it belonged to the Milanese nobleman Lorenzo Boturini Benaduci (1702–1755), who mentions it in his Idea de una nueva historia general de la América septentrional. Later it was part of the collections of Joseph Marius Alexis Aubin and of Eugène Goupil in France. At the latter's death in 1898, it was donated to the Bibliothèque Nationale. Of the twenty-eight original leaves (21 by 28 centimeters), in European paper, three are lost (between pp. 8–9, 44–45, and 46–47). In 1995, the FNL collaborated with the Society of the Americas to provide a publicly available color copy of the codex.

The first historian to write a detailed study of the Azcatitlan Codex was Robert H. Barlow in the mid-20th century. Barlow proposed the idea that the manuscript was produced by two authors and that the senior among them produced its beginning and then the Imperial and post-Conquest history. A decade later, Donald Robertson challenged the proposition that the senior tlacuiloque produced the colonial history segments by himself.

== Content ==
Codex Azcatitlan is divided into four sections, but records in one narrative the history of the Mexica people from their migration from Aztlán to about 1527, just after the death of Cuauhtémoc. The first portion of the codex is an annal of the Mexica migration from Aztlán that asserts the role of the Tlatelolca Mexica, putting them in parity to the Tenochca Mexica. As the reigning Tenocha Mexica suppressed the identity of the Tlatelolca Mexica from 1473, this would not have been possible under the Aztec Empire. The second segment recounts the history of the Aztec Empire, depicting the reigns of each of its tlatoani (Note: "Tlatoque" is the plural form of the Nahuatl title tlatoani.) in two-page spreads. The third segment details the Conquest and breaks with the traditional format of displaying the time and place of important events and only depicts the events themselves. This segment is thought to have once numbered, with the fourth, four two-page spreads. The final segment displays earlier colonial Mexican history and is broken into vertical columns that run from left to right.

The glosses, in alphabetic Nahuatl, appear mostly in the migration segment to describe places and characters, though they occasionally help translate the year glyphs for readers not familiar with pre-Conquest Aztec writing. These glosses appear in small number in the Imperial segment, and then never again.

=== Migration segment ===
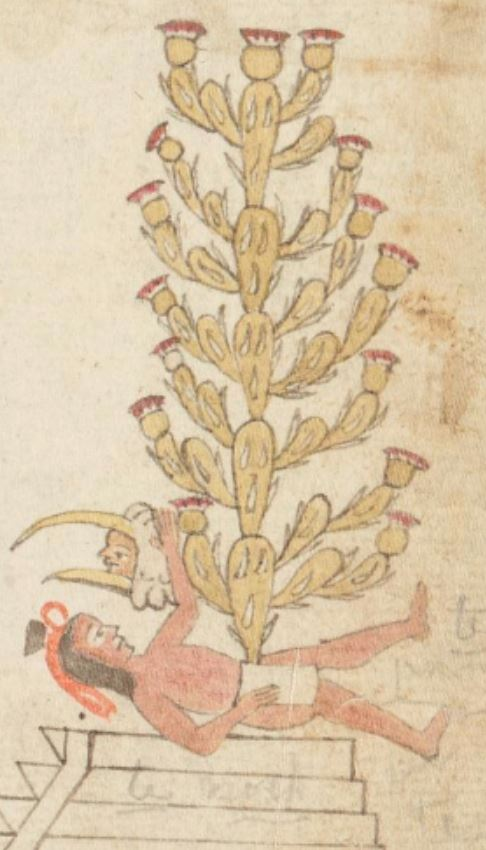
The sacrifice of Copil to Huitzilopochtli, which marks the foundation of Tenochtitlan

This segment has, unlike earlier manuscripts such as the Boturini Codex, depictions of the migration, such as their stops at sources of fresh water, getting lost, building temples, and attacks by wild animals. The tlacuiloque record every year of the migration, grouping year blocks to designate the amount of time spent at a location. Aztlán, as it is depicted in Codex Azcatitlan, strongly asserts the role of the Tlatelolca in the history of the Mexica. The island city is shown divided in two parts, like Tenochtitlan and Tlateloco. It is also shown with four "house" glyphs, referencing Tenochtitlan's four neighborhoods. The hill upon the island may also be a reference to Tlateloca; Aztlán's crest (a reed above some flowing water) is not present on the hill itself but rather atop a temple, and the words that make up Tlateloco's name (tla[lli]-, land; telol[li], hill; -co, locative suffix) best describe this view of Aztlán.

The first page of the codex, folio 1 recto (1r), shows the three rulers of the Triple Alliance, sitting upon European-style thrones in native dress and holding staves of office. Unlike earlier Aztec codices, areas of shadow are used to better define the faces on the page. The migration begins on the next page, folio 1 vecto (1v), with the departure of the Azteca from their island homeland Aztlán, as commanded by their god, Huitzilopochtli, who appears nearby as a warrior in a hummingbird headdress. Also present on folio 1v is a glyph of an ant surrounded by dots and, above it, the gloss from which the codex derives its name, which reads "Ascatitla". Emerging from this glyph is a horn, yet another reference to Tlateloco, whose first ruler was the son of the tlatoani of Azcapotzalco ("Place of the Anthill"). Guided by a dark-skinned priest, they cross from Aztlán into the domain of the altepetl of Colhuacan. There the Azteca speak amongst themselves and with Huitzilopochtli. They also meet eight tribes, the Huexotzinca, Chalca, Xochimilca, Cuitlihuaca, Malinalca, Chichimeca, Tepaneca, and the Matlatzinca, who wish to accompany the Azteca on their migration. The latter agree and the nine tribes depart, led by four 'god-bearers' named Chimalma, Apanecatl, Cuauhcoatl, and Tezcacoatl, each carrying a tlaquimilolli.

On folio 4v are depicted the first human sacrifices made by the Azteca to Huitzilopochtli, who names them the Mexica and gives them a bow, arrow, bow drill, and basket.

The Azteca stop at Coatlicamac for two years on folio 5v. The migration segment ends on folio 6r with the arrival and stay of the Mexica at Coatepec for a period of nine years.

On 12r, Copil's heart is sacrificed to Huitzilopochtli and form grows the nopal cactus marking the land Huitzilopochtli promised to the Mexica. The migration segment ends on the next page with the foundation of Tenochtitlan (left; 12v) and Tlatelolco (13r) and the selection of their respective tlatoani. Around Cuacuapitzauac, tlatoani of Tlateloco, are five figures that include his father, Tezozomoc, and other representatives of Tepanec ancestry. The two foundation scenes are separated by six men fishing and hunting in Lake Texcoco. Below the boats is a golden disk flanked by two hands.

=== Imperial segment ===
The structure of the Imperial segment is similar to contemporary Aztec codices such as the Aubin and Mexicanus codices, but especially the Mendoza Codex. The deeds of the tlatoque of Tenochtitlan are recorded in a string of events, running left to right, without any dates. This segment is not complete, as evidenced by the lack of dating and the unfinished state of the tlatoque portraits. Three glosses, the last in the codex, appear on folios 13v to 15r to elucidate some matters of Tepanec history, such as the coronation and death of Maxtla of Azcapotzalco. Most of the spreads end with the mummy of their respective tlatoani.

The segment begins on folio 13v with a nopal cactus, signifying Tenochtitlan. To its right is Acamapichtli, Tenochtitlan's first tlatoani. This pattern repeats for each of the succeeding tlatoani. The first glyph Acamapochtli's right is that of Colhuacan, his home altepetl, above which is the disembodied head of Huitzilopochtli. Next are shown three conquests by the Mexica of Mixquic, Cuitlahuac, and Xochimilco for Azcapotzalco. After these is the construction of a palace or temple in Tlatelolco, where Cuacuapitzauac and three relatives appear. In the middle of the spread, Tezozomoc dies and is succeeded by Maxtla. Also depicted is the development of sustenance on Lake Texcoco by the Mexica. Finally, Acamapichtli's mummy appears at the far right side of the spread.

The depictions of Acamapichtli (13v) and Axayacatl (18v) are the only fully painted portraits in the Imperial segment. The former is painted by the master tlacuilo and the latter by the apprentice.

=== Conquest segment ===
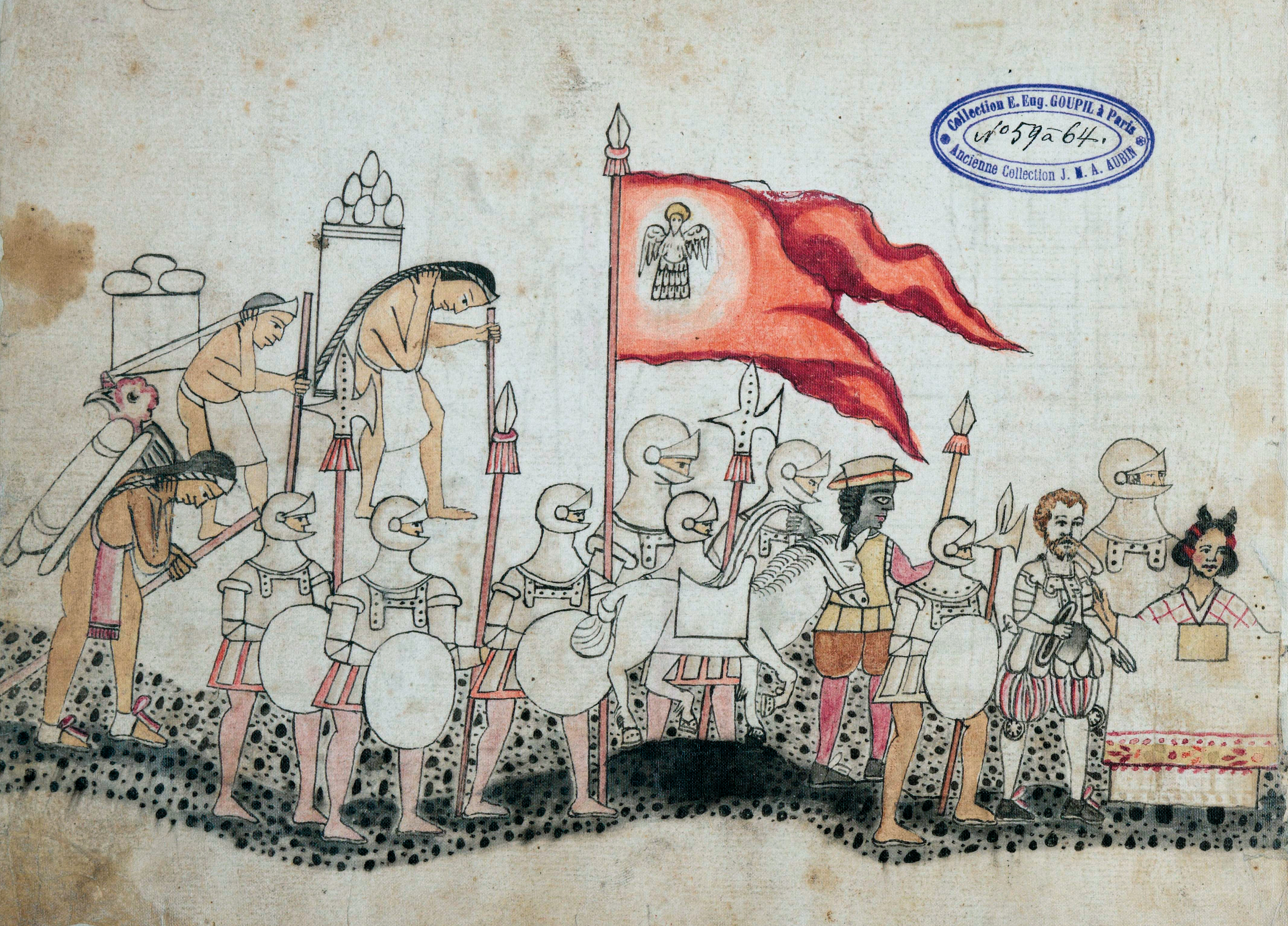
Hernán Cortés, La Malinche and possibly Juan Garrido leading the Spanish army on folio 22v

The Conquest segment is also incomplete, lacks any dating whatsoever, and contains no glosses. Its content focuses on the exploits of the Tlateloca warrior Ecatl, known in Spanish as Don Martín. The segment has strong narrative similarity to other indigenous accounts of the Conquest, namely book 12 of the Florentine Codex and the Annals of Tlateloco. The master tlacuilo of the Azcatitlan Codex minimize native defeats and maximize their victories. This segment once contained four two-page spreads, but two have been lost.

The segment begins on folio 22v with Hernán Cortés and La Malinche as they encounter another party. Behind Cortés stands his army, rendered as eight conquistadors, an African slave, a horse, and three native men carrying supplies while Malinche translates for him. Who she speaks to is made unclear by the loss of the next page, but it is probable that the event depicted is Cortés's meeting with Moctezuma II outside Tenochtitlan on 8 November 1519.

Next is folio 23r, the right half of a spread depicting the Toxcatl massacre of 1520, ordered by Pedro de Alvarado. The Templo Mayor dominates the right side of the folio while a European-style building likewise occupies the top portion. The composition of the folios recalls both the massacre and the subsequent uprising of the city against the Spanish. A warrior holding a captured Spanish standard in the middle of the square as warriors charge into battle around him. Two corpses lie on the ground next to him, as does a severed head wearing a hummingbird headdress. In front of the temple stand two drummers, one with his hands amputated. Behind them lies the body of a tlatoani upon the steps of the temple, from which two more tlatoque watch. On the opposite side of the temple, a man dressed as a hummingbird stands ready with his macuahuitl and chīmalli.

On the left side of folio 23v is a Spanish ship and six armored Spaniards in the water in front of it. A native man pulls a Spaniard out while another fights a Mexica warrior armed with a Spanish sword. The fighting Spaniard holds a shield decorated with a solar image. Barlow identified him as Alvarado, or "Tonatiuh" as he was known to the Mexica. As indicated by the ship, the scene is of a failed attack in May 1521 led by Alvarado that nearly saw Cortés captured while he was attempting to save drowning Spaniards. Cortés is thought to be the Spaniard being pulled out of the water by the native man. The Mexica warrior dueling Alvarado is Ecatl, who led Tlatelolco's warriors against the Spanish and once captured a banner from Alvarado. (Note: Whether or not the banner was captured from Alvarado himself or one of his men is disputed. Spanish captains sometimes carried their banner, but Alvarado himself was not captured.) Ecatl is distinguished from earlier warriors in the codex by his tunic's wavy pattern, shared by the waters around Aztlán and those of Tenochtitlan when the Mexica first arrived there in the earlier Migration segment. His shield is also similar in design to that of Huitzilopochtli's on folio 1v, with a quincunx that references Huitzilopochtli's reign as the Fifth Sun. These signs all identify Ecatl as a holy warrior of Huitzilopochtli.

Folio 24r depicts the evacuation of Cuauhtemoc's wife Tecuichpotzin from Tenochtitlan on 31 August 1521, after the former's surrender of the city. Three boats, each seating a woman, sail along the bottom of the page. Above them, five more women stand on top of some buildings. Their clothing denote them as being wealthy, with the woman at far right possibly being Tecuichpotzin.

=== Post-conquest segment ===
Folios 24v to 25r break the established flow of narrative to present its content in two vertical columns per page.

The segment begins on folio 24v with a pile of bones, representing the destruction of Tenochtitlan. Next the elite of Tlatelolco are shown leaving the city to resettle under Spanish rule beneath a glyph for Amaxac, where Cuauhtemoc surrendered. This was also the site of departure for the city's populace after the surrender in August 1521. Four native rulers sit below, representing Cuauhtemoc, Coanacoch of Texcoco, Tetlepanquetzal of Tlacopan, and Temilotl of Tlatelolco. Next, the beginning of Christianization in the 1520s is marked by a vertical line of nine friars; a tenth friar baptizes an indigenous man. Above and between the nine priests is a palo volador dance with four participants and a musician on top of the pole. Following the priests are a series of images (digging stick, wood, water) that symbolize the reconstruction of Tenochtitlan-Tlatelolco as Mexico City under Tlacotl, whose name is represented by the hand grasping an animal's head. Above the construction is a representation of a battle at Colhuacan.

The right half of folio 24v and all of folio 25r, recount the events of the years 1524 to 1526. Its content pertains to the events of Cortés's expedition to Honduras and his killing of Cuauhtemoc, supposedly for plotting to kill Cortés, while other Spaniards were doing likewise. The left side of folio 24r pertains to the expedition while the right concerns events back in the former Aztec Empire.

The time of Cuauhtemoc's death, the ritual month of Tozoztontli, is marked by the tlacuilo in the upper-right corner of folio 24v. Below the dating glyphs is the inspiring actor of the killing, Mexicatl Cozoololtic, (Note: The depiction of Mexicatl Cozoololtic, also called Cozte Mexi, matches his physical description and the phonetics of his name (Coz[oololtic], "calves round as balls"; te[mazcalli], "steam bath"; Mexicat[zinco], Cozte Mexi's home altepetl, -tzinco denoting bent legs in glyphic form). It is also an allusion to a tradition in some Mesoamerican codices of depicting slaves and captives naked and in awkward positions.) who accused Cuauhtemoc of plotting to kill Cortés and La Malinche. Mexicatl Cozoololtic watches from afar as a Mayan lord, possibly Paxbolonacha, brings drums out of a building for a celebration at Acallan. Following this is the hanging of the tlatoque) at Hueymollan and the appointing by Cortés of Tlacotl as governor of Tenochtitlan. Tlacotl appears in bust form, below a seated tlatoani, looking into an indigenous palace. The Tlatoani is then connected by dots to a series of glyphs marking the location of the killings and promotion. While Cortés was in Honduras, a power struggle erupted between the man he left in charge, Alonso de Estrada, and two of his other men, Gonzalo de Salazar and Pedro Almíndez Chirino. Salazar and Chirino seized Cortés's estate and then murdered his cousin Rodrigo de Paz, depicted as the corpse in the top right in the Church of San Francisco in Mexico City. With Cortés's aid, Estrada arrested Salazar and Chirino and then beheaded their supporters, as shown in the bottom left. Estrada is rendered just above this second act of killing.

The final extant page of Codex Azcatitlan, folio 25v, records the arrival of Mexico's first bishop, Julián Garcés and the torture of native persons for the location of Moctezoma's treasure. The page begins with a heavily damaged rendering of a meteorological event and a death by stoning in the ritual month of Atlcahualo. Garcés and an entourage that includes a seated tlatoani cover the upper half of the page and a mounted woman in the bottom left corner. The indigenous man is either the governor of Tenochtitlan or Tlatelolco, while the other members of the entourage are denoted as being of high status by their umbrellas. The woman in the bottom left is thought to be María Estrada, a member of Cortés's original expedition. On the lower half of the page, a Spaniard approaches two corpses tied to stakes that separate him from a chest.

== See also ==
- Mesoamerican codices
- Aztec codices
- Lorenzo Boturini
- Aztecs
- Aztlán
- Spanish conquest of the Aztec Empire
