= Codex Chimalpopoca =

Postconquest cartographic Aztec codex

Codex Chimalpopoca or Códice Chimalpopoca is a postconquest cartographic Aztec codex which is officially listed as being in the collection of the Instituto Nacional de Antropología e Historia located in Mexico City under "Collección Antiguo no. 159". It is best known for its stories of the hero-god Quetzalcoatl. The current whereabouts of the codex are unknown. It appears to have disappeared in the mid-twentieth century, so that study of the codex can be done only through copies and photographs. The codex consists of three parts, two of which are more important, one that regards the pre-Hispanic history of Central Mexico, the Anales de Cuauhtitlan, and the other that regards the study of Aztec cosmology, the Leyenda de los Soles.

== Physical characteristics ==
According to Walter Lehmann, who studied the Codex in 1909 and 1926 when it was housed at the Museo Nacional de México, the manuscript was about 22 cm high and 15 cm long. The paper was thin and yellowed with worn edges.

== Name ==
The title page Codice Chimalpopoca is accompanied by the date 1849 and a note explaining that the name was given it by Charles Étienne Brasseur de Bourbourg, in honor of a Mexican scholar of the early nineteenth century, Faustino Galicia Chimalpopoca.

== History ==
The original of the manuscript is unknown and the original is probably a copy of an even older work. The handwriting of the three parts of the copied manuscript in Mexico's National Institute are all in one hand. The script is provided with cover pages bearing the genealogy of Mexican historian Fernando de Alva Ixtlilxochitl. Although Ixtlilxochitl himself does not make mention anywhere in his works of this manuscript, it is tempting to speculate that he is the copyist. In the mid-eighteenth century, the well known collector Lorenzo Boturini Benaduci describes a manuscript that closely resembles the Codex Chimalpopoca, and specifies that it was copied by Ixtlilxochitl. What is known is that at the end of the eighteenth century, Mexican scholar Antonio de León y Gama made a copy of the manuscript, which is preserved at the Bibliothèque nationale de France. Following the disappearance of the original manuscript, probably in 1949, the best source for its study is the photograph of the original that was taken by Primo Feliciano Velázquez in 1945.

== Contents ==
Codex Chimalpopoca is composed of three parts unrelated to each other. The first part, called Anales de Cuauhtitlan (Annals of Cuautitlán), is an alphabetic text in Nahuatl, which takes its name from the city of Cuautitlán. The content is primarily historical. It nevertheless contains a brief version of the Leyenda de los Soles (Legend of the Suns). This part occupies pages 1–68 of the codex. The second part, with the title Breve relación de los dioses y ritos de la gentilidad, consists of a short book written in Spanish (pages 69–74 of the manuscript) by a certain Indian cleric of the late sixteenth and early seventeenth centuries, Pedro Ponce de León, which deals with Aztec deities and rites. The third part, called Leyenda de los Soles is another work in Nahuatl that develops versions of the most frequently cited sun legends (pages 75–84). The codex's name was given by Mexican scholar Francisco del Paso y Troncoso in 1903. The second section, the Breve relación, is not included in the 1945 copy.

== Bibliography ==
- Bierhorst, John (1992). History and mythology of the Aztecs: the Codex Chimalpopoca. Tucson, AZ: University of Arizona Press. ISBN 978-0-8165-1886-9.
- Graulich, Michel (1987). Mythes et rituels du Mexique ancien préhispanique (in French). Brussels, Belgium: Académie Royale de Belgique. ISBN 978-2-8031-0170-2.
