= Codex en Cruz =

Pictorial Aztec codex containing the Annals of Cuauhtitlan

Codex en Cruz fol. 1r

The Codex en Cruz is a pictorial Aztec codex consisting of a single piece of amatl paper. It records historical events, such as the succession of rulers, wars, and famines from 1402 to 1557 in the Nahuatl script. The codex centers on the city of Texcoco, but also includes information pertaining to Tenochtitlan, Tepetlaoztoc and Chiautla. I consists of three larger square units, which are read from left to right. Each of these larger units covers a 52 year cycle. Each is subdivided into four smaller sections read from top-left counterclockwise.

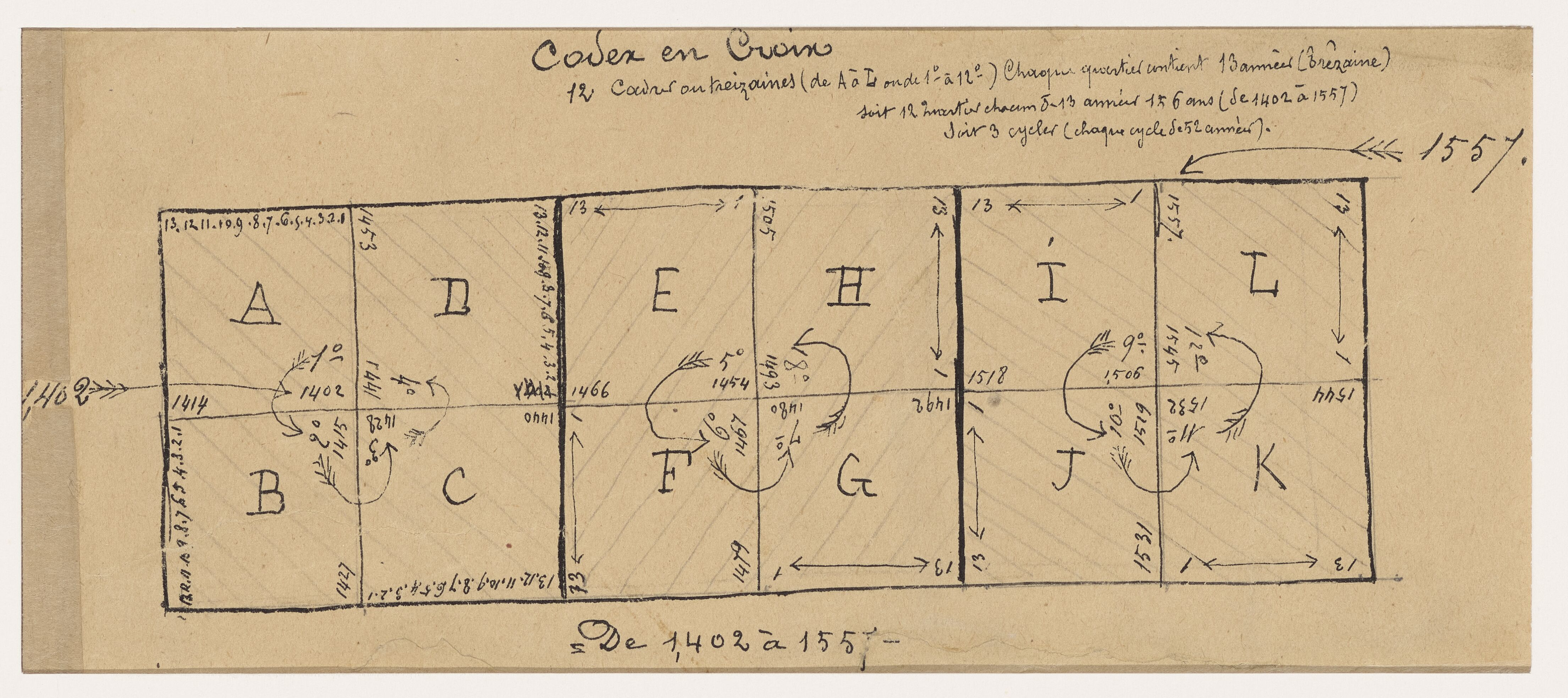
Codex en Cruz reading instructions by Eugène Goupil

It is currently held by the Bibliothèque Nationale in Paris after having been donated to the institution posthumously by Eugène Goupil. One of its previous owners was Alexander von Humboldt, who reportedly purchased it from the Antonio de León y Gama collection.
