= Matrícula de Tributos =

Nahuatl manuscript, with glyphs

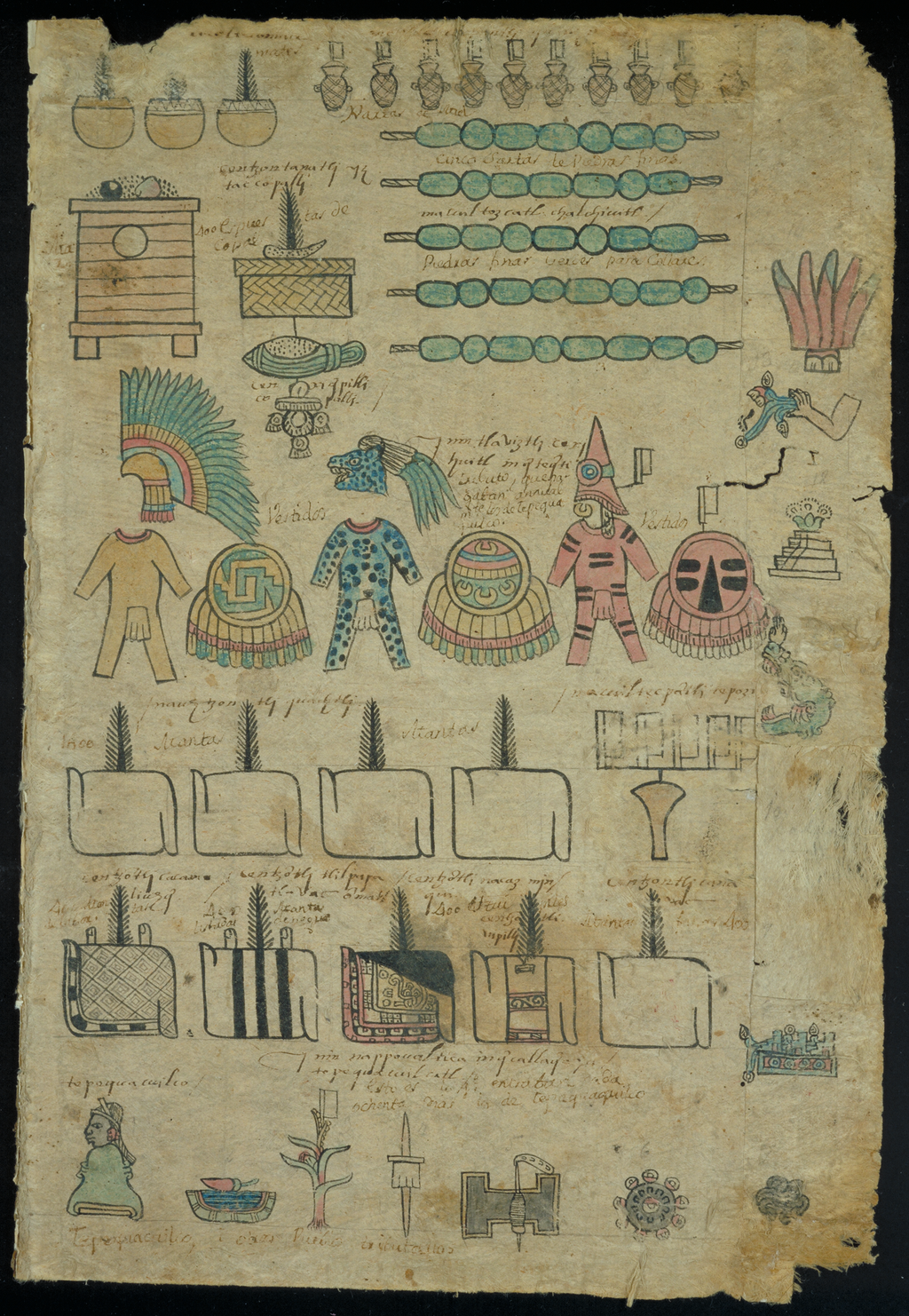
Folio 9r of the Matrícula de tributos.

The Matrícula de Tributos (English: Tribute roll) is a 16th-century central Mexican manuscript on fig bark amatl paper, listing the tributes paid by the various tributaries of the Aztec Empire. The manuscript is composed of 16 pages (32 leaves) with likely more being lost, measuring 42 centimeters high and 29 centimeters wide. The dating of the Matrícula has been a subject of debate as to whether it dates to pre-Columbian or early colonial times, if truly being pre-Columbian then it would be the only surviving preconquest Aztec manuscript.

== Dating ==
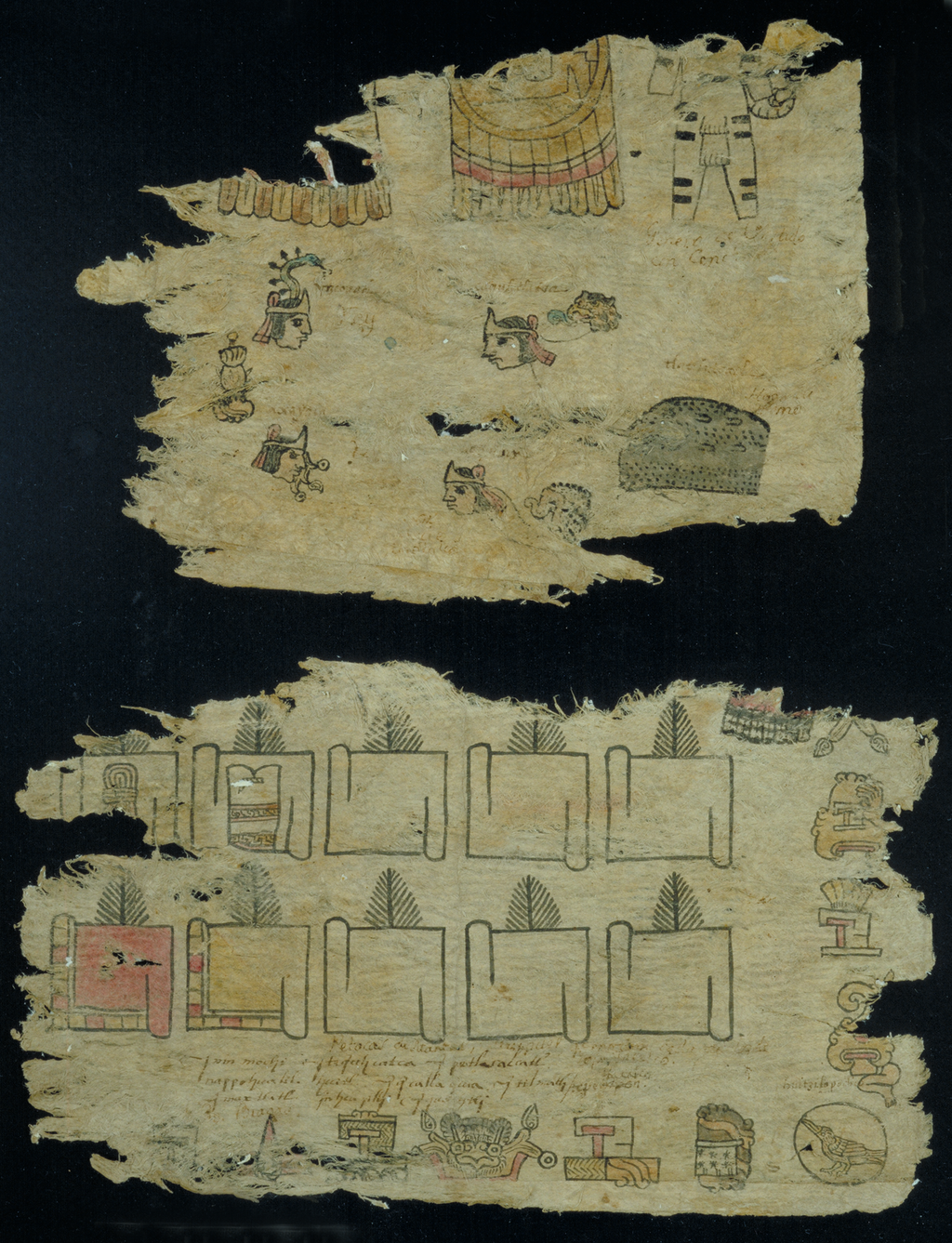
Folio 2r of the Matrícula de tributos depicting the relationship between Tenochtitlan and Tlatelolco, this folio has evidence of European influence from the features of the humans painted (squared jaws, expressive eyebrows, and long noses).

There are debates among scholars as to when the Matrícula was created, with many differing opinions on the origins of the document over the decades. Robert Barlow in 1949 argued that it was a colonial-era document, newly painted for conqueror Hernán Cortés, arguing that the format of the manuscript was European. In 1963 Woodrow Borah and Sherburn Cook postulated that both the Matrícula and Codex Mendoza were copied from another preconquest document in the colonial era.

Frances Berdan in 1980 hypothesized it was a preconquest manuscript, citing lack of Spanish influences, other than the glosses, Another hypothesis is that it was made after 1511. Berdan contends that the Matrícula could have been created throughout the last decade of Moctezuma II's reign. Luz María Mohar challenged Berdan's hypothesis, arguing in 1997 that the document was made 10-20 years after Spanish conquest as a copy of older documents. In 2007 Juan José Batalla Rosado supported Berdan's hypothesis; his analysis found that the document had multiple styles, suggesting it was made over multiple years by different scribes before conquest. In 2021, Jorge Gómez Tejada put forth the hypothesis that the folios date to multiple periods, several from just at the end of preconquest and others as late as 1560. His analysis found several folios whose art styles seemed to indicate European influence, drawing humans and zoomorphic glyphs with Europeanized features not depicted in Codex Mendoza, which follows more pre-Columbian tradition.

== History ==
Some time after conquest, the leaves of the manuscript were glued together front to back to emulate a European book. Several decades after its painting the Matrícula was used as a reference for Codex Mendoza's tribute section, several pages disappeared after this time.

The first historical mention of the Matrícula appears in Lorenzo Boturini Benaduci's collection of Mexican documents in the 1740s. Two pages of the Matrícula were donated in 1830 to the American Philosophical Society in Philadelphia by Joel Roberts Poinsett, the first United States envoy to Mexico. In 1937 Daniel Rubín de la Borbolla wrote to the Society that their pages were part of a larger document in Mexico and requested they sent pictures of the pages to him, several days later the Society subsequently unanimously voted to repatriate the pages instead. After some delays were returned to Mexico in 1942, when Mexico and the United States became allies in World War II. Harry M. Lyndenberg handed the pages to distinguished Mexican scholar, Alfonso Caso, as a part of the dedication ceremony for the Biblioteca Benjamín Franklin in Mexico City. With its hundreds of tribute glyphs, the Matrícula is considered an important document in the study of Nahuatl and Aztec culture, mathematics, governance, economy and geography. It is held in the collection of the Instituto Nacional de Antropología e Historia.

The first reproduction of the Matrícula was done in 1770 and the document has been reproduced multiple times since then.

== Content ==
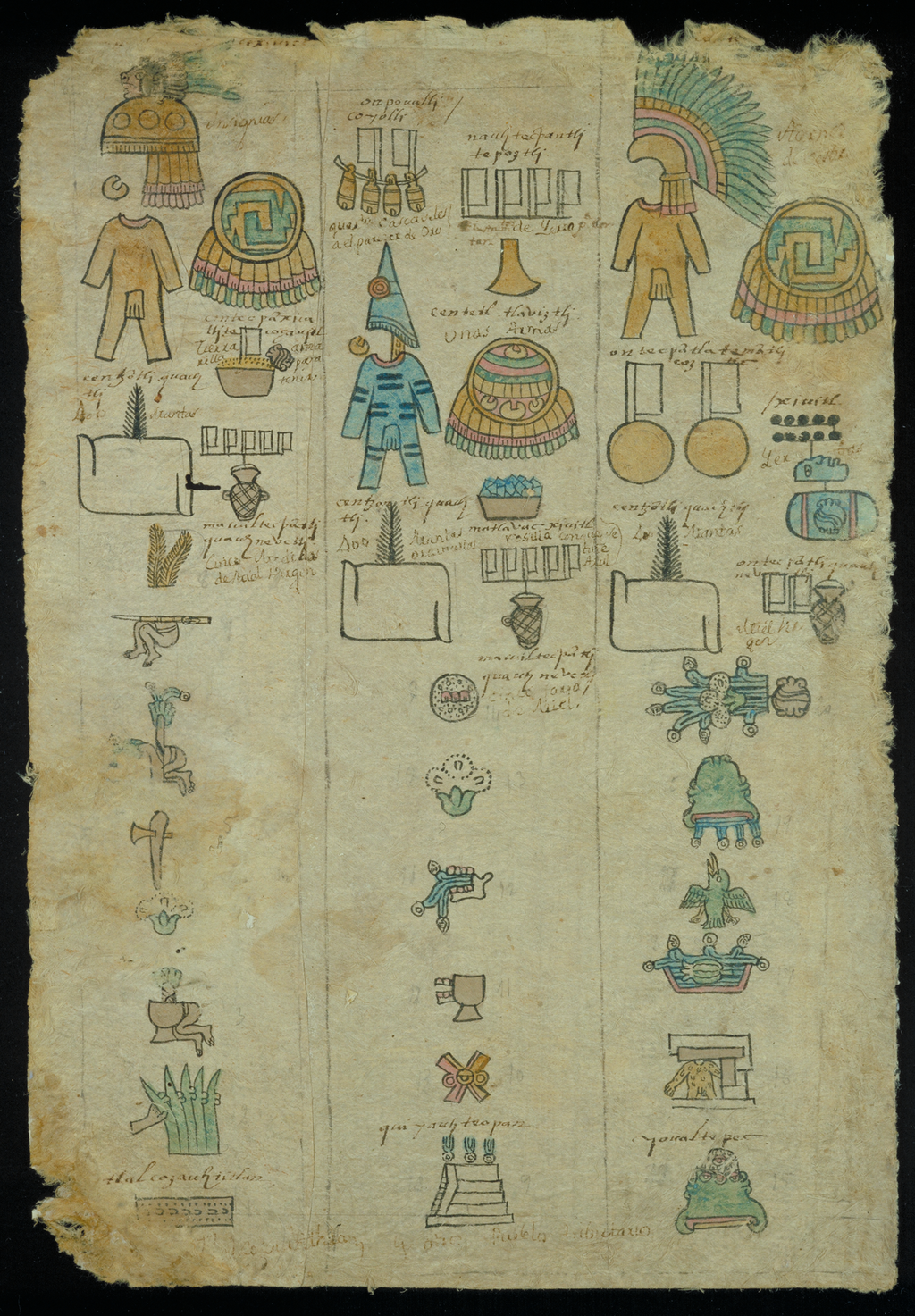
Folio 10v of the Matrícula de tributos, this unique page depicts 3 provinces instead of 1: Tlalcoçauhtitlan, Quiauhteopan, and Yoaltepec.

The first 3 leaves (folios 1r, 1v, and 2r) are heavily damaged and are also unique in having red lines dividing the page. Folios 1r and 1v depict the frontier regions of the empire while 2r depict the relationship between Tenochtitlan and Tlatelolco. These folios (in addition to folio 13r and 14v) were the ones found by Gómez Tejada to have had the human facial features painted with European influence. The rest of the manuscript follows a standard formula, each leaf depicts 1 province (8r and 10v being exceptions depicting 2 and 3 provinces respectively), starting at the bottom left of the folio starts with the glyph for the major city of the province followed by other towns in the province running up the right edge of the page if needed. The rest of the page is dedicated to items that are expected to be sent to Tenochtitlan as tribute, with many provinces expected to send regional items not readily available elsewhere (i.e. feathers, dye, cacao, cotton, seashells). Each item is marked with a numerical glyph for how many loads were expected, a white flag for 20, a black and white feather for 400, and a white pouch for 8000. Comparing the Matrícula with the Codices Mendoza and Azoyú II and another colonial document showed that all had similar numbers for expected tribute of the Tlapa province, proving the Matrícula's accuracy in depicting expected tribute across the empire.

Analyzing the warrior attire required by Tenochtitlan found in the Matrícula, five major regions could be found, the Eastern and Southern regions were not required to send as much warrior attire, despite having access to the feathers required to make them. However, the dry provinces surrounding the island capital of Tenochtitlan were required to send the most, forcing them to trade with the other regions to obtain the required feathers for the warrior attire. This could be evidence of a symbolic division of the empire rather than a practical one.

== Scribes ==
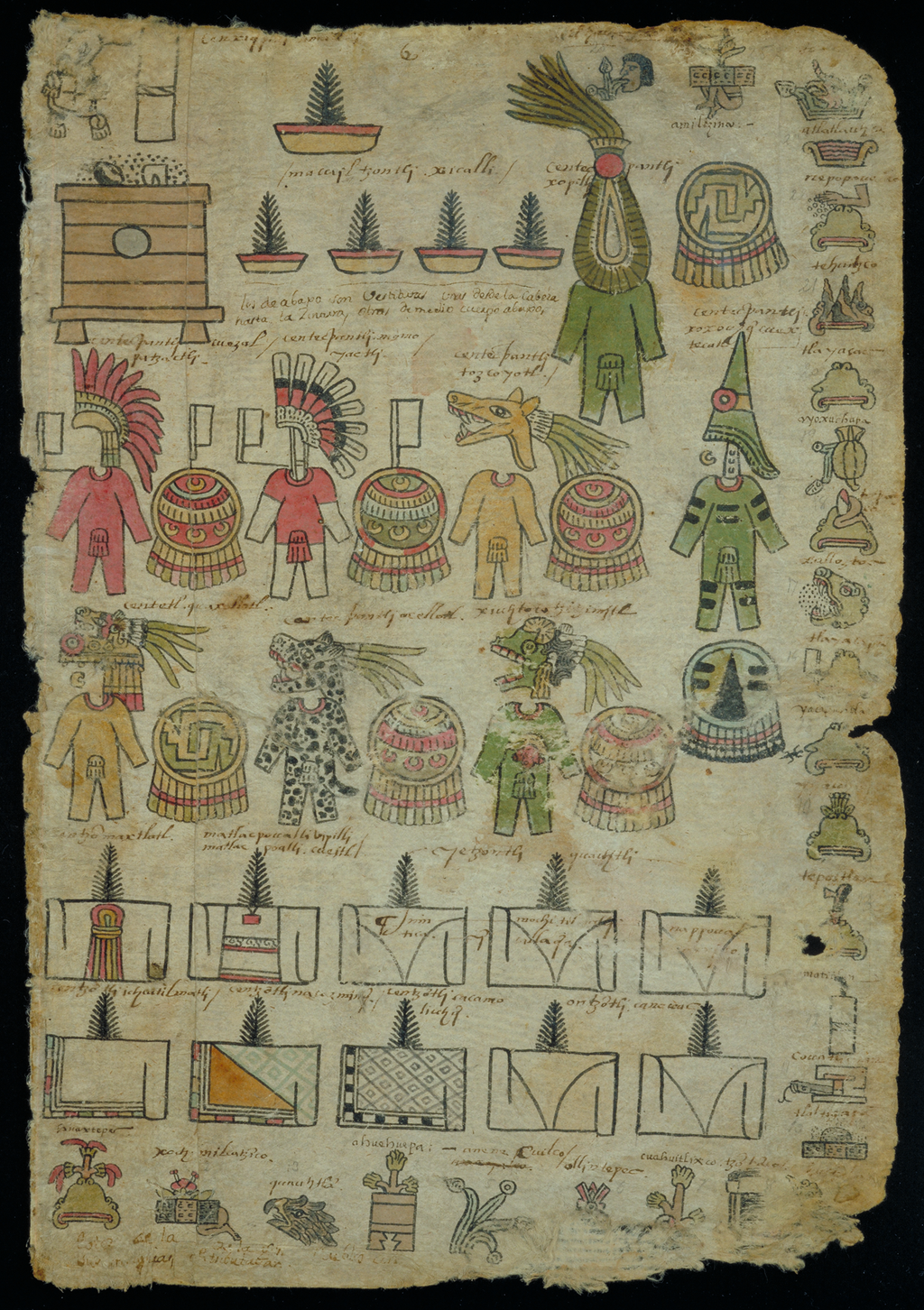
Folio 4r of the Matrícula de tributos, one of the pages painted by the Mixtec scribe.

The scribes of the Matrícula are not known but Batalla Rosado's 2007 analysis was able to identify 6 different painting styles attributing each to a different painter. A Mixtec painter was identified by Batalla Rosado from 1 of the styles by recognizing the sign for hill used by this scribe is from the Mixtec script rather than the Aztec script. Batalla Rosado argues that 1 of the scribes from the Matrícula is the same painter charged with creating the Codex Mendoza possibly named Francisco Gualpuyogualcal. This idea has been pushed back against by Gómez Tejada who argued that the Matrícula actually belonged to a group of documents that the Mendoza referenced rather than being the work of a scribe from the Matrícula. During the colonial period the Matrícula was maintained and repaired by Mexica elite.
