= Juan Cano =

Juan Cano may refer to:

- Juan Cano de Saavedra (c. 1502–1572), Spanish conquistador
- Juan Cano (soccer) (born 1956), retired Colombian-American soccer forward
- Juan Manuel Cano (born 1987), Argentine racewalker
