= Acozac =

Acozac Archaeological Site
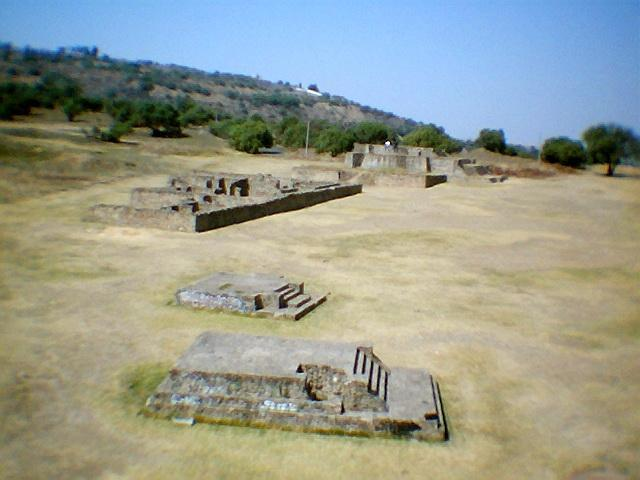
- Acozac Archaeological Site
- Interactive map of Acozac Archaeological Site
- 19.3291°N 98.8923°W
- Type: Archaeology
- Periods: Classical - Postclassical
- Cultures: Chichimeca – Acolhua – Tepanec
- Location: Ixtapaluca, State of Mexico; Mexico
- Region: Mesoamerica (Mexico)

History
- Built: 900 - 1521 CE.

Site notes
- Website: Acozac Archaeological site (Spanish)

Acozac (Ixtapaluca) is an archaeological site located in the Municipality of Ixtapaluca, State of Mexico, Mexico. The site is at kilometer 30 of federal road Mexico City–Puebla, towards Ixtapaluca.

== The site ==
Has been linked with Tlazallan - Tlallanoztoc, (Codex Xolotl) as the grandson of Xólotl Techotlallatzin cities site. Ceramic evidence indicates the site had occupation at the following periods: foundation probably started in Azteca I phase (900 to 1,200 CE), and continued with Aztec phase II (1200 to 1430) (Techotlallatzin reign). Azteca phase III (1430 to 1521) structures are currently visible.

Techotlallatzin, Texcoco tlatoani died in 1406, his son Itzcoatl took his place, an inexperienced Prince and was surprised at his city, by Tezozomoc, Azcapotzalco tlatoani, escaped with his son Nezahualcoyotl in arms. He was chased up a forest, where he managed to hide the baby before being killed.

== Structures ==
Circular temple is dedicated to worship Ehecatl, "the wind god".

The Great Platform (between the circular temple and the Palace), the structure has rooms, patios and altars; some red stucco finishing remains to date; also, two small altars were found near the foundation of the main temple and in front in the lower part.

Over a hundred structures have been detected, presumably for residential use.

From the site the volcanoes Popocatepetl and Iztaccihuatl can be seen, the site is in the middle of a forest, and the construction remains can be seen, in addition to the natural landscape.
