= Goupil =

Goupil may refer to:

== People ==
- Eugène Goupil (1831–1896), French Mexican philanthropist and collector
- Guillaume François Charles Goupil de Préfelne (1727–1801), member of the Council of Five Hundred
- Jeanne Goupil (born 1950), French actress
- Linda Goupil (born 1961), Québécois politician
- René Goupil (1608–1642), French missionary, one of the first North American martyrs of the Roman Catholic Church
- Romain Goupil (born 1951), French cineaste

== Places ==
- Manneville-la-Goupil, a commune in the Seine-Maritime department, Haute-Normandie, France

== Other ==
- Goupil & Cie, 19th-century French art dealership
- Goupil Industrie, a manufacturer of electric vehicles
- SMT Goupil, French IT company on the timeline of DOS operating systems
