= Mapa Quinatzin =

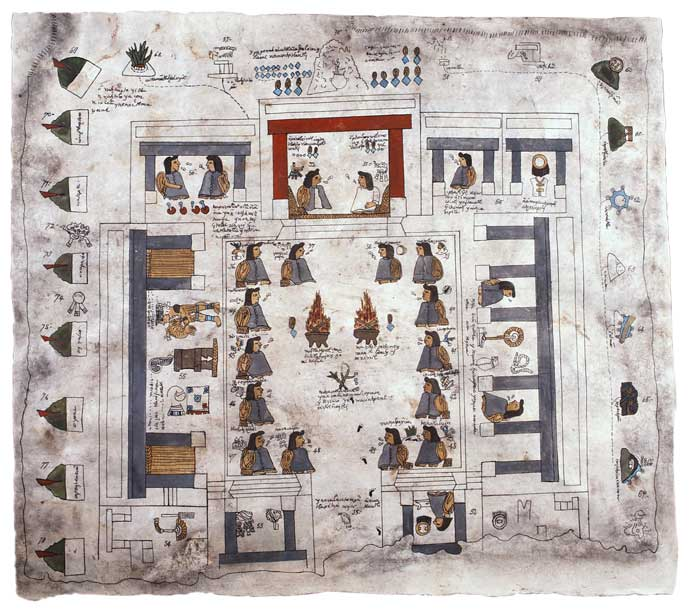
Palace of Nezahualcoyotl, Mapa Quinatzin

The Mapa Quinatzin is a 16th-century Nahua pictorial document, consisting of three sheets of amatl paper that depict the history of Acolhuacan.

== See also ==
- Aztec codices
- Codex Xolotl
