= Codex Osuna =

1565 Aztec codex

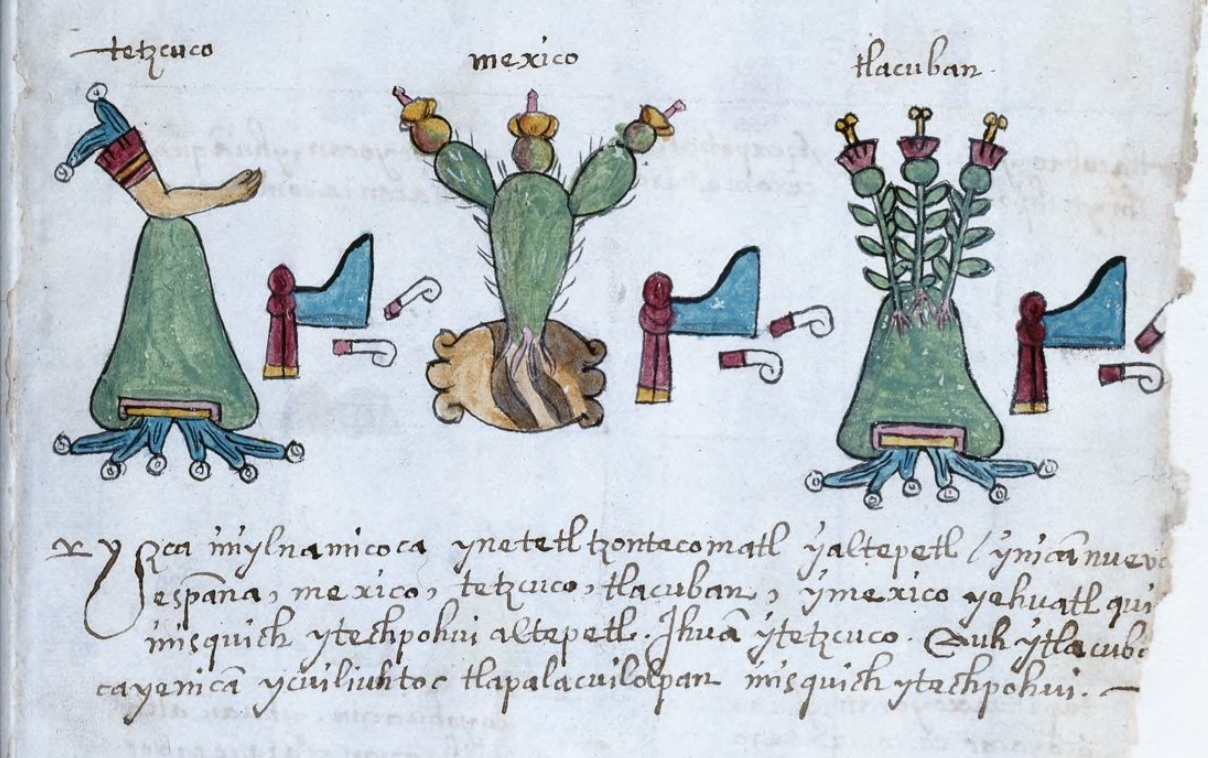
Section of page 34 (folio 496) of Codex Osuna showing the glyphs for Texcoco, Tenochtitlan, and Tlacopán.

Codex Osuna is an Aztec codex on European paper, with indigenous pictorials and alphabetic Nahuatl text from 1565. It has seven parts, with most being economic in content, particularly tribute, with one part having historical content. It was named after the Spanish nobleman, Mariano Francisco de Borja José Justo Téllez-Girón y Beaufort-Spontin, twelfth Duke of Osuna, in whose library the codex was held until his death in 1882. It then became part of the collection of the Biblioteca Nacional in Madrid. It is part of a lawsuit by the indigenous of a Nahua community against Spaniards, and a fragment of a much larger Mexican text; the first numbered folio in the facsimile is 464.

The seven separate documents were created in early 1565 to present evidence against the government of Viceroy Luís de Velasco during the 1563-66 inquiry by Jerónimo de Valderrama. In this codex, indigenous leaders claim non-payment for various goods and for various services performed by their people, including building construction and domestic help. A modest black and white facsimile was published in Mexico by the Instituto Indigenista Interamericano in 1947, reproduced from the 1878 edition published in Madrid. The Mexican edition includes 158 pages of documentation in Spanish found in the Archivo General de la Nacion (Mexico) added by Luis Chávez Orozco.

The codex was originally solely pictorial in nature. Nahuatl text was then entered onto the documents during its review by Spanish authorities, and a Spanish translation of the Nahuatl was added. The Nahuatl text was translated by Ignacio M. Castillo and the Spanish paleography rendered into modern Spanish by María del Carmen Camacho. The pictorial of folio 471v (p. 198 of the Mexican edition) shows the Viceroy Don Luís de Velasco, with indigenous lords in colonial attire for their rank, as well as a nahuatlato or Nahuatl translator in Spanish attire. The illustration is the cover for Charles Gibson (historian)'s classic publication, The Aztecs Under Spanish Rule. Other important pictorial elements include depictions of Spaniards punishing indigenous (folio 474v, page 204), lists of encomienda holders, including ones reverting to the Spanish crown (folios 496v - 498r; pages 250-253); cultivation of cacti for the production of the red dye cochineal (folio 500v, p. 258), and indigenous men laboring in a textile workshop or obraje (folio 500v, p. 258). The last pictorial is of indigenous men laboring to extract and transport stone for the construction of a church (folio 501 v., p. 342), with a written complaint that they had not been paid.

The 1947 Mexican edition is augmented by documentation in Spanish found by Luis Chávez Orozco in the Mexican Archivo General de la Nación, giving contextual information for the pictorial Codex Osuna, and is perhaps the "lost portion." The Spanish documentation includes the review of an indigenous official's tenure, or residencia, and is typical of Spanish official documentation of the era.
