= Codex of Tlatelolco =

Pictorial central Mexican manuscript

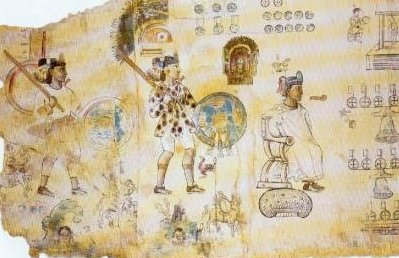
Codex page showing two warriors. the seated ruler, and a list of tributes submitted to him.

The Codex of Tlatelolco is a pictorial central Mexican manuscript containing a history of events occurring in Tlatelolco, from before 1550 to after 1564, in the period before and after the Spanish conquest of the Aztec Empire. Due to its name, it is sometimes confused with the Latin script, the manuscript Anales de Tlatelolco, also sometimes called the same name.

The codex, drawn up using the Aztec ideographic script, describes participation of Tlatelolco warriors in putting an end to the rebellion in Mexico's northern frontiers in 1541.

The Codex, in addition to the so-called The Tlaxcala canvases are sometimes cited as one of the clearest examples of the emerging cultural mestisization in Mexican society in the first decades after the Conquest: within the text, new rulers are presented as continuators of old traditions, in the illustrations warriors dressed in jaguar skins and costumes of eagles dance at the foot of the new Spanish the viceroy of New Spain and the new archbishop in the same way as they are depicted on the previous pages dancing in front of the priests and tlatoani. The pictographic layer of the codex shows the influences of Renaissance European art.
