= Temilotzin =

- Born: End of the 15th Century
- Died: 1525

Temilotzin was born in Tlatelolco and ruled Tzilacatlan. He rose to the rank of Tlacatecatl (prince; second in command) during his military time. He was a friend of Cuauhtemoc. He fought against the conquistadors during the Conquest of the Aztec Empire at Cuauhtemoc's side. He was present at the moment when the Spanish were leaving Tenochtitlan during La Noche Triste. He was at Cuauhtemoc's side when the Mexica had to surrender. He was forcibly sent to expedition to Honduras along with Cuauhtemoc. According to Anales de Tlatelolco, Temilotzin witnessed Cuauhtemoc hung from a ceiba tree.

== Poetry ==
Temilotzin is remembered by one poem. He probably had more poems, but this poem is the only one that survived. The poem is about making friends.

A poem attributed to Temilotzin is "Temilotzin Icuic" ("Poem of Temilotzin").
