= Codices of San Andrés Tetepilco =

Aztec manuscripts from the 15th century

Codices of San Andrés Tetepilco are Aztec codices made during the 1500s by Tlacuilos or Aztec scribes. It details the Founding of Tetepilco (now the borough of Iztapalapa), the inventory of an unnamed Church at Tetepilco and the transition and Conquest of the Aztec led by Hernán Cortés. The codices were acquired from a family who resided in Culhuacan and Iztapalapa.

== Discovery ==
First documented in 2009, by University of Seville historian María Castañeda de Paz in Coyoacán, the corpus belonged to an anonymous family, who are deemed traditional stewards for the cultural history of Culhuacán and Iztapalapa. After years of coordination and negotiations on behalf of the Mexican government, through INAH, the family was paid 9.5 million pesos ($500,000 USD equivalent).

== Contents ==
There are three codices, much of which are heavily damaged and all are incomplete:

The Map of the Founding of Tetepilco is a map of Tetepilco, that provides the information on the founding of Pueblo San Andrés Tetepilco, with markers for Colhuacan, Tetepilco, Tepanohuayan, Cohuatlinchan, Xaltocan, and Azcapotzalco.

The Inventory of the Church of San Andrés Tetepilco is a heavily damaged map of the church of San Andrés Tetepilco consisting of two extant pages.

The Tira of San Andrés Tetepilco is a pictographic history to the style of and familial strain of the Codex Boturini, the Aubin Codex, and MS.40 and MS.85 of Paris. Tira of San Andrés Tetepilco consists of 20 folded sheets depicting the history of Tenochtitlan, with a founding date of 1300, with the conquest of Tetepilco by Itzcoatl and Moctezuma I between 1427-1440. The history extends itself past the Spanish conquest, with Cortés depicted as a Roman soldier, extending to the year 1611.

They are a bilingual text, written in both Spanish and Romanized Nahuatl, and the texts itself are written on amate, with its dyes and inks composing of various plants, charcoal, and indigo, which make up its red, yellow ocre, black and blue.

== Reception ==
The acquisition and documentation of the codices has been praised by INAH as the most significant authentication event of Mesoamerican text since the Maya Codex of Mexico. The three documents presents an addition to over a total of 200 Mesoamerican codices now in the collection of the Biblioteca Nacional de Antropología e Historia.
