= Santa Cruz Map =

Historic map of Mexico City

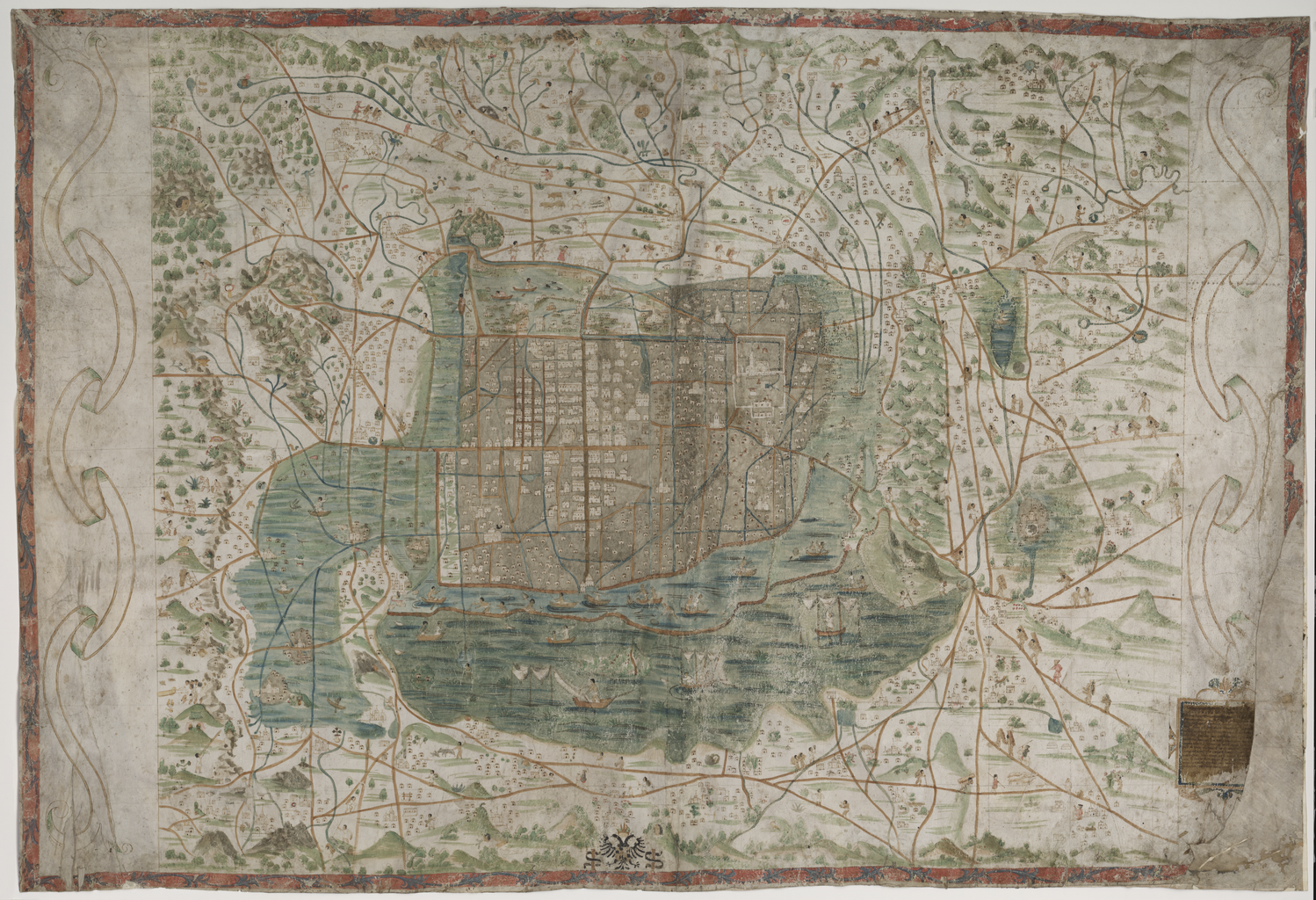
Santa Cruz Map

The Santa Cruz Map (Also known as the Uppsala map) is the earliest known city map of Mexico City as the capital of New Spain. The map depicts the city’s layout with its buildings, streets, and waterways surrounded by the lakes of the basin of the Valley of Mexico and the countryside beyond. In the map one can also see images of daily life, animals and plants. It is a watercolor map that was painted between 1550 and 1556.

The map gets its name from Alonso de Santa Cruz, court cartographer to Charles V (king of Spain at that time), and who for a while was considered author of the map. Since the 20th century, the map is viewed as being the work of a group of Tlahcuiloh artists at the Colegio de Santa Cruz at Tlatelolco. This is posited because of the indigenous glyphs found on the map, its similarity to other works from the Colegio de Santa Cruz and also due to the fact that Alonso de Santa Cruz never visited New Spain.

The map currently resides in the archives of the Uppsala University library and is the place where the map was rediscovered, hence the origin of the map's other title as the “Uppsala map”.

== History ==
This map is believed to have been made in Mexico and sent to Alonso de Santa Cruz in Spain. After getting possession of the map Alonso de Santa Cruz included a dedicatory written in Latin for the king Carlos v and gave it to the king. After this, the exact whereabouts of the map was lost, with the only reference to it being a copy made by Alsonso de Santa Cruz in his Islario general de todas las islas del mundo. The map was rediscovered in Sweden in the Library of the University of Uppsala around the end of the 1880s.

== Description ==
The exact identity of the material on which the map is on is disputed and there are two major views. One of the earliest scholars to comment was Francisco del Paso y Troncoso who claimed that the map consisted of two pieces of animal skin joined together, while Sigvald Linne states that the map is made up of one long strip of parchment. The map is 1.14 m long and has a width of 78 cm. The map is heavily influenced by European Renaissance landscape maps, but also has a strong indigenous influence. On the map are around 200 toponymic glyphs with only around 120 of these being exactly identified, with some glyphs being given a Nahuatl name written in the latin script. Many are not named though and at times it can be difficult to identify a glyph because of the European influence on them, which can make them look as if they were part of the landscape.

On the bottom of the map towards the middle there is a Double-headed eagle and on the lower right side there is a dedicatory in Latin for the king. A portion of the dedicatory is cut off and due to the age of the map, the dedicatory has also become illegible.

== Orientation of the map ==
The map is oriented so that the viewer observes the city and Valley of Mexico from the east. North, therefore, is to the right, south to the left, and west at the top of the map. Mexico City occupies the center of the map, drawn enlarged in relationship to the surrounding lakes and countryside, as befits its importance. All the buildings are drawn with their front facades facing the east, whether or not that was their actual orientation, so that they can be seen as though the viewer were standing in front of them.

Major streets are indicated, such as Tecuba Street. The new cathedral of Mexico City is shown by the central plaza. Other important edifices include the Viceregal Palace, the churches associated with the Augustinian, Dominican, and Franciscan Orders, and Hernán Cortés residence. Each major building had been built utilizing European architecture and is drawn with its characteristic architectural details, such as arches, so that the viewer would have an idea of how it actually appeared.

The lakes and marshes surrounding the city are represented accurately as they appeared in relation to the city; not in scale.

== Digitization ==
The map was digitized and annotated by a team from the University of Art and Design Helsinki and can be accessed online by the public at the project page.
