= Lorenzo Boturini Benaduci =

Italian historian and collector and ethnographer of Mexico

Lorenzo Boturini Benaducci
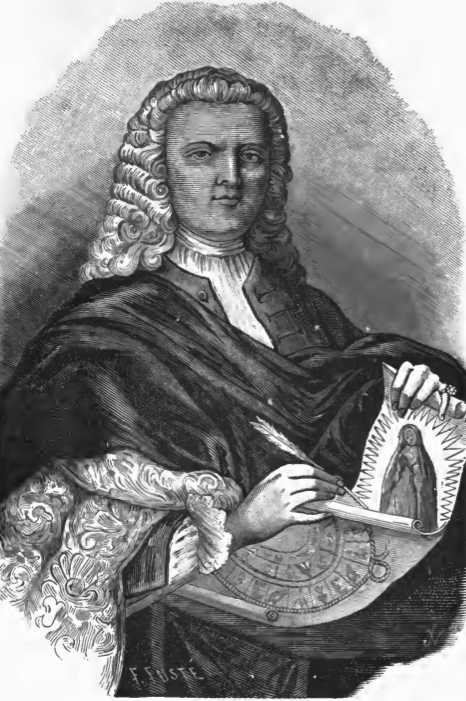
- Born: Lorenzo Boturini Benaducci c. 1702; Como, Italy
- Died: c. 1753 age 51; Madrid, Spain
- Occupations: historian, antiquary, and ethnographer

Lorenzo Boturini Benaducci (also Botterini) 1698, Sondrio, Italy – 1749, Madrid) was a historian, antiquary and ethnographer of New Spain, the Spanish Empire's dominions in North America.

== Early life ==
Born in Italy of noble parentage, Lorenzo Boturini Benaducci studied in Milan and lived in Trieste and Vienna. He was a knight of the Holy Roman Empire. Forced to flee Austria because of the war with Spain, Boturini arrived in Spain via England and Portugal. In Madrid he met the Condesa de Santibáñez, oldest daughter of the Condesa de Moctezuma, who authorized him to collect a pension due her, as a descendant of the Aztec Emperor Moctezuma II, from the royal treasury in New Spain.

== In New Spain ==
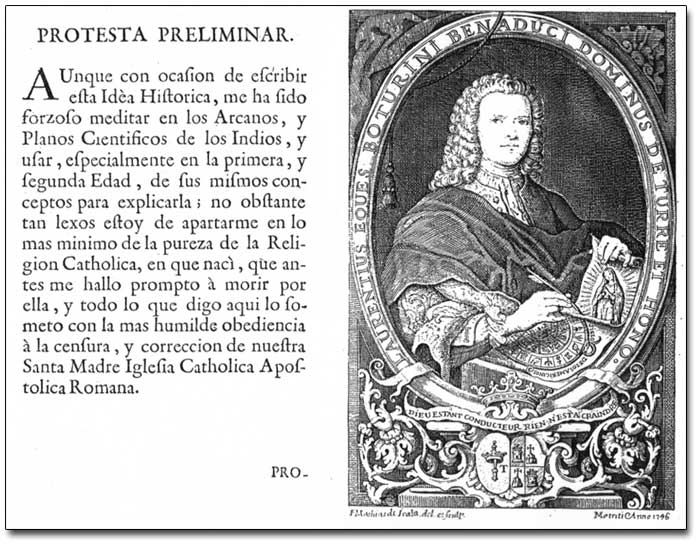
Statement by Lorenzo Boturini

Boturini went to New Spain in 1736, where he remained eight years, exploring remote regions and, in the words of Prescott, "living much with the natives, passing his nights sometimes in their huts, sometimes in caves, and the depths of the lonely forests." During those years he assembled a vast collection of paintings, maps, manuscripts and native codices. He copied more than 500 pre-Columbian inscriptions and made his own drawings of monuments and sculptures, and he investigated the history of the apparition of the Virgin of Guadalupe on the hill of Tepeyac. He traveled widely and on his travels brought together the largest collection of Mexican antiquities assembled to that time by a European.

Not only did he intend to write the history of the Virgin of Guadalupe, but he also had plans to crown her image with a gold crown. For that purpose he sought donations from the bishops and from the public. This brought him to the attention of the colonial government, which was suspicious of the motives of a foreigner making this proposal.

On 2 June 1744 after an investigation, the recently arrived viceroy on 3 November 1742, Pedro Cebrián, 5th Count of Fuenclara, had him imprisoned and impounded his collection. He was accused of entering New Spain without license from the Council of the Indies and of introducing papal documents without a royal permit.

== Vindication ==
After eight months in prison, Boturini was sent to Spain. He fell into the hands of pirates, who eventually released him at Gibraltar. From there he traveled to Madrid, in miserable conditions. In Madrid he met Mariano Fernández de Echeverría y Veytia, another passionate collector of Indian antiquities. Fernández de Echeverría y Veytia offered Boturini a place to live and financial support, and got the Council of the Indies to reconsider his case. Boturini was absolved. The king named him royal chronicler of the Indies, ordered that his collection be returned to him, and extended an invitation for him to return to New Spain. Boturini, however, declined to return to New Spain, and his collection was never restored. It appears that he was granted recompense and a stipend to work on his projected history of the colony.

In Madrid he wrote a history of ancient Mexico, unpublished at the time of his death in 1755. The library at the Basílica de Nuestra Señora de Guadalupe is named for him.

== The Boturini Collection ==
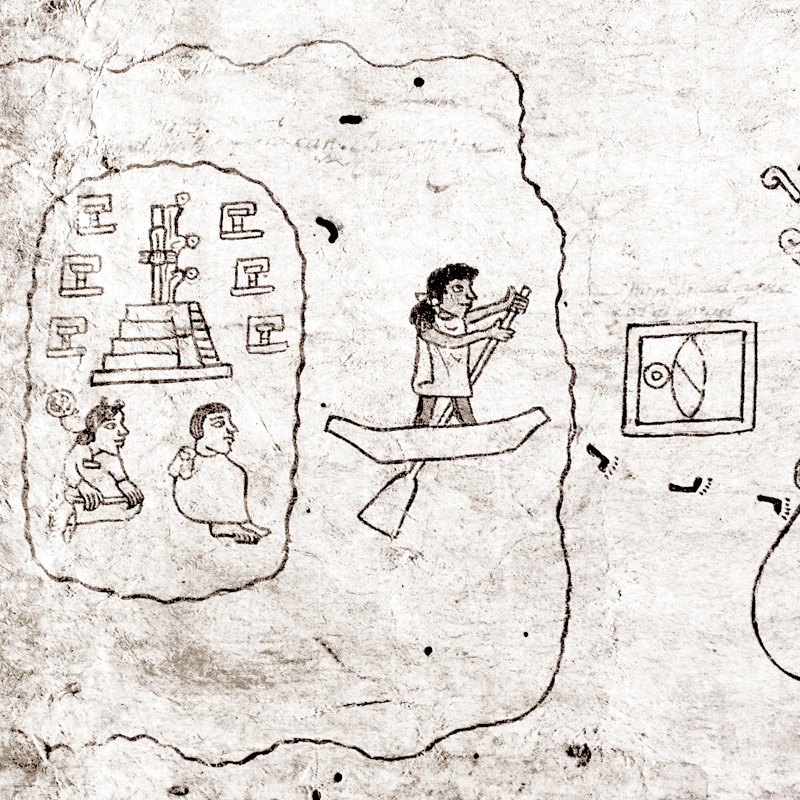
The Aztecs (Mexica) depart from Aztlan, in a scene from the Boturini Codex.

The collection was formed between 1736 and 1744, to serve as the basis of a projected Historia de América Septentrional. It consisted of many valuable documents, the majority of them of Indian provenance. Among these were hieroglyphic paintings that had belonged to Juan de Alva Ixtlilxochitl, a descendant of the rulers of Texcoco. Ixtlilxotchitl bequeathed these documents to Don Carlos de Sigüenza y Góngora.

The collection was confiscated by Viceroy Pedro Cebrián y Agustín at the time of Boturini's arrest in 1743. It was deposited in the office of the secretary of the viceroyalty. The documents were neglected there for years and suffered considerable pilferage.

The subsequent viceroy, Juan Francisco de Güemes, 1st Count of Revillagigedo, granted the historian and antiquary Fernández de Echeverría y Veytia (Boturini's friend from Madrid) the paintings and documents he solicited for his own studies. On Fernández de Echeverría y Veytia's death, they passed to Antonio de León y Gama. He died in 1802, and the collection passed to his heirs. Shortly thereafter, 16 paintings were obtained by Alexander von Humboldt during his visit to Mexico in 1802–03. He published them in Vues des cordillères et monuments des peuples indigènes d'Amérique. The originals of these are now in the Berlin State Library.

Part of the remainder of the collection may have passed to Father José Pichardo, an amateur antiquarian. Joseph Marius Alexis Aubin, beginning in 1827 or shortly thereafter, obtained important parts of the collection from a variety of sources. He sold his collection to Eugène Goupil, who was of French and Mexican descent. This part of the collection passed by donation or purchase to the National Library in Paris, where it remains, under the name Aubin-Goupil Collection.

Shortly after Mexican independence, the rest of the original collection was transferred to the library of the university, and from there in 1823 to the Conservatory of Antiquities. Later the collection was housed in the National Library. Currently it is in the National Museum of Anthropology in Mexico City.

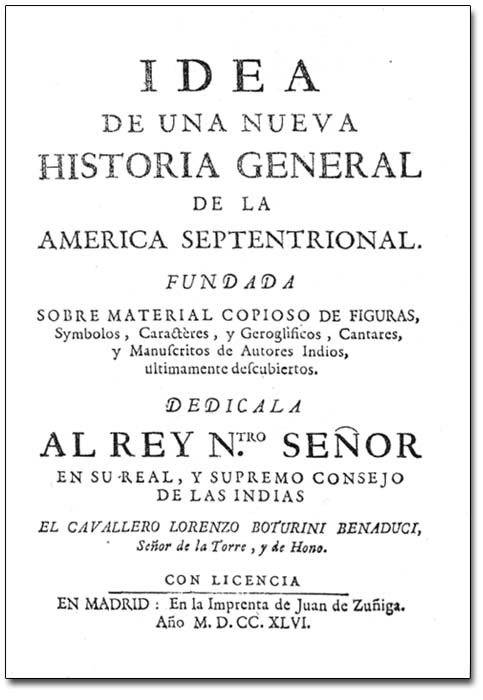
Title page of the Idea de una Nueva Historia general de la América Septentrional, 1746.

== Writings ==
- Oratio ad Divinam Sapientiam (unedited).
- Idea de una Nueva Historia General de la América Septentrional. Madrid, 1746; Mexico City, 1871.
- Catálogo del Museu Indiano. Mexico City, 1871.
- Historia general de la América Septentrional por el caballero Lorenzo Boturini Benaducci. Madrid, 1948.
- Idea of a New General History of North America: An Account of Colonial Native Mexico by Lorenzo Boturini Benaduci. (Author), Stafford Poole (Translator), Susan Schroeder(Foreword) University of Oklahoma Press, 2015.
