= Codex Mexicanus =

Mexican pictorial manuscript

The Codex Mexicanus is an early colonial Mexican pictorial manuscript.

The Codex can be divided into several sections:

1. The saints, the European calendar and zodiac.
2. The Aztec calendar.
3. Accounts in the Aztec pictographic writing system.
4. A family tree of the rulers of Mexico.
5. The history of the Mexica from their departure from Aztlan.
6. Colonial history.
7. Two Christian scenes: the Temptation of Christ and the Adoration.
8. A tonalamatl. This last section is incomplete.

It is currently held in the Bibliothèque Nationale, Paris.

== See also ==
- Aztec codices
- Codex Vaticanus B
