= Codex Xolotl =

Postconquest cartographic Aztec codex

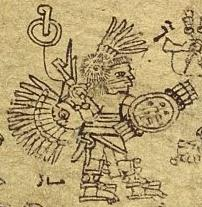
The Aztec king Chimalpopoca in Huitzilopochtli costume, from the Codex Xolotl.

The Codex Xolotl (also known as Códice Xolotl) is a postconquest cartographic Aztec codex, thought to have originated before 1542. The text is primarily graphic, but it is also annotated in Nahuatl. It details the preconquest history of the Basin of Mexico, and Texcoco in particular, from the arrival of the Chichimeca under the ruler Xolotl in the year 5 Flint (1224 C.E.) to the Tepanec War in 1427.

The codex describes Xolotl's and the Chichimecas' entry to an unpopulated basin as peaceful. Although this picture is confirmed by the writings of mestizo historian of Texcoco Fernando de Alva Ixtlilxochitl (1568 or 1580–1648), there is other evidence that suggests that the area was inhabited by the Toltecs. Alva Ixtlilxochitl, a direct descendant of Ixtlilxochitl I and Ixtlilxochitl II, based much of his writings on the documents which he most probably obtained from relatives in Texcoco or Teotihuacan. The codex was first brought to Europe in 1840 by the French scientist Joseph Marius Alexis Aubin, and is currently held by the Bibliothèque nationale de France in Paris. The manuscript consists of six amatl boards measuring 42 cm × 48 cm (17 in × 19 in), with ten pages and three fragments from one or more pages. While it is unknown who did the binding of the manuscript, it is cast like a European book back to back. The Codex Xolotl has been an important source for detailed information on material culture, social, political and cultural changes in the region during the period. It is one of the few still surviving cartographic histories from the Valley of Mexico and one of the earliest of its type.

== Historical significance ==
The Codex Xolotl is an example of material culture. This means that the codex can be used as a means to understand the culture of the Aztecs and regional variation. The codex itself shows an understanding of the history of Texcoco. It is also a document that includes an early instance of Nahuatl writings referencing specific dates in an indigenous calendar. There are ongoing debates regarding how many writers were involved in creating the codex.

There are some debates that question how valid the codex is from an archaeological perspective. This debate roots itself in the work of Jeffrey Parsons in 1970s, with his book detailing the archaeology of the Texcoco region. One perspective on this debate states that the codex itself is not supported by the archaeological evidence of the region.

Another argument claims that within the discrepancies, some historical facts can be separated from the mythology. An alternate response to Parsons' argument uses a hypothesis regarding a conflict between the Tula and Cholula regions to support Parsons' position.

== See also ==
- Aztec codices
