= Juan Cano de Saavedra =

Spanish conquistador

Don Juan Cano de Saavedra (ca. 1502–1572) was a Spanish conquistador from Cáceres in Extremadura.

At age 18, Cano travelled to the New World and took part in Pánfilo de Narváez's expedition against Hernán Cortés. Cano subsequently fought for Cortés after Narváez's defeat, including in the siege of Tenochtitlan.

In 1532 Cano married Isabel de Moctezuma (Tecuichpotzin), principal heir of Moctezuma II, becoming her fifth husband. The couple had five children: Pedro, Gonzalo, Juan, Isabel, and Catalina. Both daughters became nuns.

Cano claimed that Isabel's relationship to Moctezuma II implied that they and their children should be in charge of all of Moctezuma's former domain, but this did not convince his fellow Spaniards. However, he still held substantial swathes of land in Mexico, and lived comfortably when he returned to Spain in the 1560s. He died in Seville in September 1572.
