= Antonio de León y Gama =

Mexican astronomer, anthropologist and writer (1735–1802)

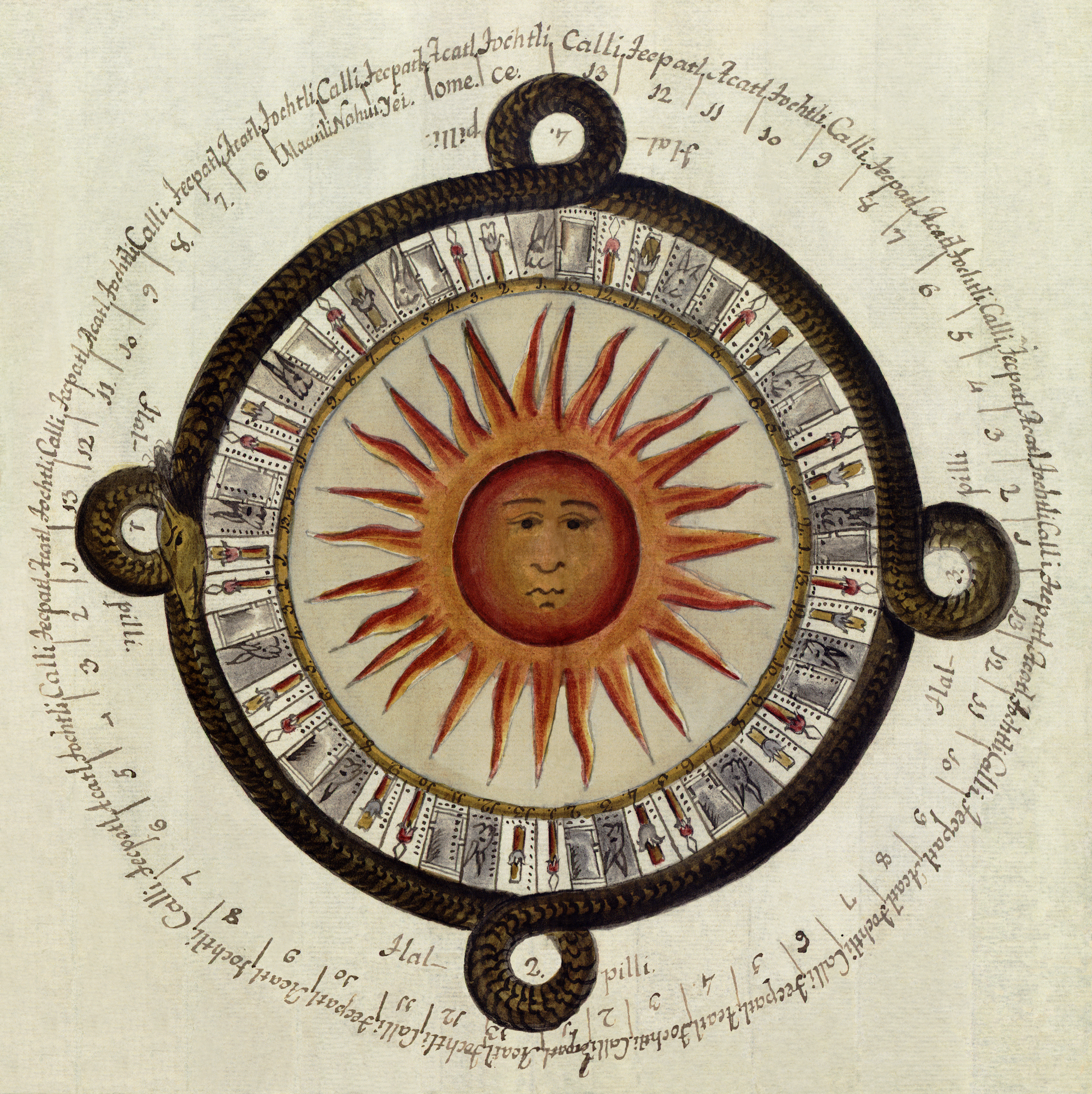
Illustration depicting an ancient Mexican calendar, of Antonio de León y Gama's book on the discovery of the sun stone. Digitally restored

Antonio de León y Gama (1735–1802) was a Mexican astronomer, anthropologist and writer. When in 1790 the Aztec calendar stone (also called sun stone) was discovered buried under the main square of Mexico City, he published an essay about it, Descripción histórica y cronológica de las dos piedras que con ocasión del nuevo empedrado que se está formando en la plaza principal de México, se hallaron en ella el año de 1790 (Historical and chronological description of two Stones that were found in the plaza of Mexico in 1790 upon the occasion of laying the new pavement) explaining the functioning of Aztec calendars.

== Life ==
Antonio de León y Gama was born in 1735, the son of a jurist in the city of Mexico, who was notable due to being the author of a book on contracts; His mother died at his birth. He remained in Mexico City his whole life and died there in 1802. Between 1753 and 1755 he attended to the Jesuit San Ildefonso law school, achieving a degree. In 1758 began work at the Real Audiencia of Mexico where he remained all his professional career. He was not wealthy and had many descendants. He was a self-trained mathematician and astronomer, "becoming one of the most capable Mexican astronomers of his day."

== Works ==
Title page of León y Gama's book

Antonio de León y Gama wrote works in different fields of science, such as astronomy, medicine, or history, although he is most known for his description of the discovery of the Aztec calendar stone.

Some of his works are

- Astronomy:
  - Calendario 1771 (Calendary 1770)
  - Calendario 1772 (Calendary 1771)
  - Descripción orthográphica universal del eclipse de sol del día 24 de junio de 1778 (Universal orthographic description of the sun eclipse of 24 June 1778)
  - Observaciones meteorológicas (Meteorological observations) in Gaceta Mexicana, February 1787.
  - Discurso sobre la luz septentrional que se vio en esta ciudad el día 14 de noviembre de 1789 (Discourse on the septentrional light seen in this city on 14 November 1789) in Gaceta Mexicana, October 1789
  - Disertación física sobre la materia y formación de las auroras boreales (Physical dissertation on matter and the formation of the auroras borealis), 1790.
  - Carta a un amigo (Letter to a friend), in Gaceta Mexicana, April 1801, where he describes how centuries should be counted.
- Medicine:
  - Instrucción sobre el remedio de las lagartijas (On the remedy of wall lizards), 1782, where he debated the use of wall lizards as a cure for cancer.
  - Respuesta satisfactoria (Satisfactory answer), 1783.
- History:
  - Descripción histórica y cronológica de las dos piedras que con ocasión del nuevo empedrado que se está formando en la plaza principal de México, se hallaron en ella el año de 1790 (Historical and chronological description of two Stones that were found in the plaza of Mexico upon the occasion of laying the new pavement).
  - Compendio de la historia antigua de la Nueva España, desde sus primeros pobladores hasta despúes de la conquista; deducido de la pinturas de los indios, de los mejores manuscritos que dejaron estos así en su idioma como en nuestro castellano y de otros documentos originales donde se refutan varias relaciones históricas. MS in the Huntington Library, microfilm in the Library of Congress

=== Historical and chronological description of two Stones that were found in the plaza of Mexico upon the occasion of laying the new pavement ===
This book was published in 1792. In it León y Gama described the discovery in 1790 of two of the most important pieces of Aztec art in the Zócalo, main plaza of the city of Mexico: the sun stone and a statue of Coatlicue, an Aztec goddess. León y Gama also included in it most of his knowledge and theories on how the Aztecs measured time. The work, as opposed to authors of previous centuries, praised Aztec society and their scientific and artistics achievements in line with the growing Mexican nationalism in the late 18th century. It was published by Felipe de Zúñiga y Ontiveros, owner of one of the most important printing establishments in America at the time. In addition to print the book had three folded manuscript watercolor drawings. Thanks to the publication of the book León y Gama is considered by many the first Mexican archeologist.
