= Anales de Tlatelolco =

Codex manuscript

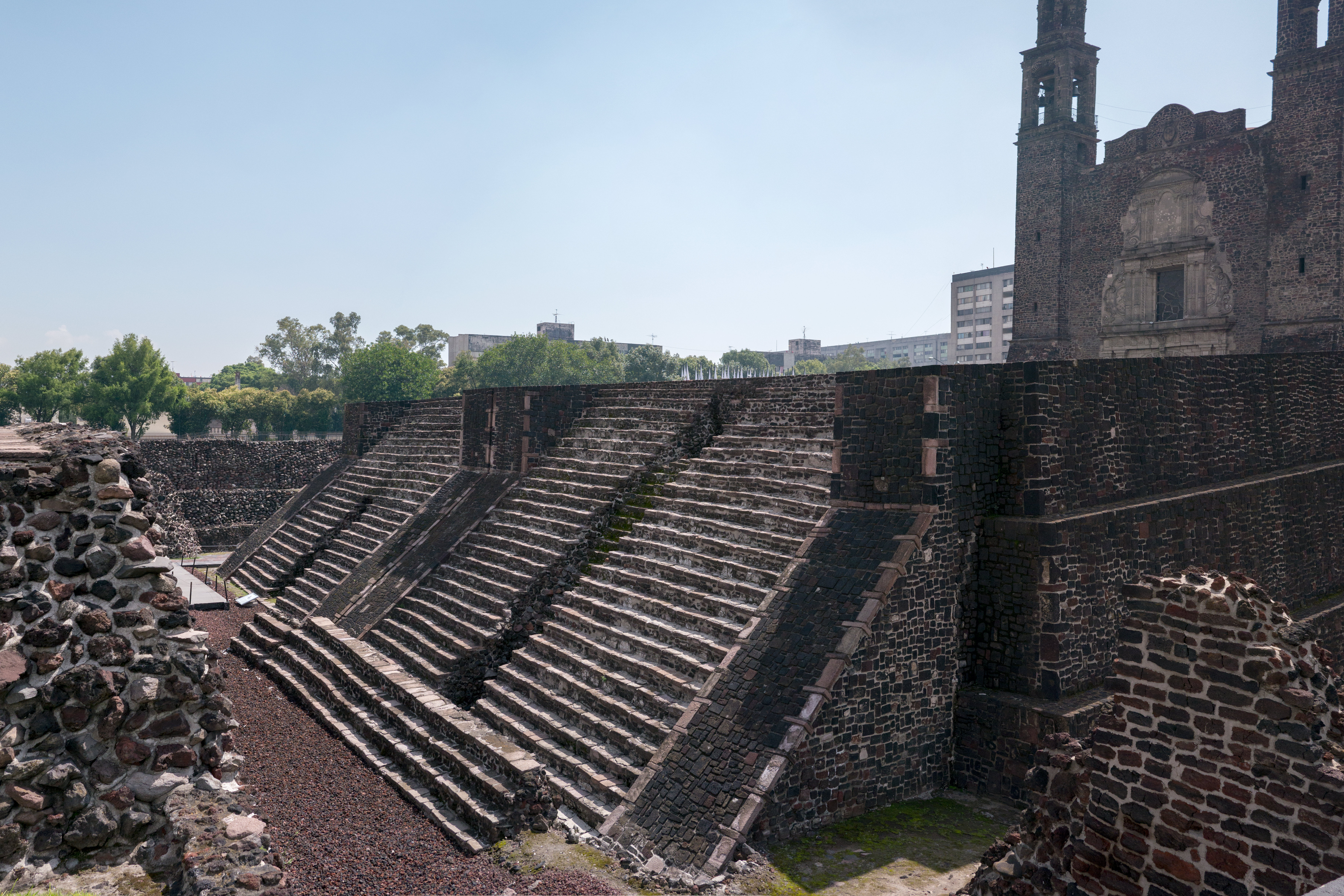

The Anales de Tlatelolco (Annals of Tlatelolco) is a codex manuscript written in Nahuatl, using Latin characters, by anonymous Aztec authors. The text has no pictorial content. Although there is an assertion that the text was a copy of one written in 1528 in Tlatelolco, only seven years after the fall of the Aztec Empire, James Lockhart argues that there is no evidence for this early date of composition, based on internal evidence of the text. However, he supports the contention that this is an authentic conquest account, arguing that it was composed about 20 years after the conquest in the 1540s, and contemporaneous with the Cuernavaca censuses. Unlike the Florentine Codex and its account of the conquest of the Aztec Empire, the Annals of Tlatelolco remained in Nahua hands, providing authentic insight into the thoughts and outlook of the newly conquered Nahuas.

== Description ==
The Annales De Tlatelolco are made up of two different manuscripts that are currently being kept at the Bibliothèque Nationale de France in Paris. The manuscript, formally titled manuscript 22, is written on a traditional bark paper called “amate”. The other one, Manuscript 22bis, however, is written on traditional European paper. Manuscript 22 is divided into six separate notebooks; each of them originally contained two papers front to back with information, meaning each separate notebook has up to four pages of writing.

The document is the only one that contains the day the Aztecs exited Aztlan-Colhuacan, as well as the day of the founding of Mexico-Tenochtitlan.

Its authors preferred to remain anonymous, probably to protect them from the Spanish authorities. It is suspected these authors later became the sources for Bernardino de Sahagún's works. The priest Ángel María Garibay K. provided one translation of the manuscript into Spanish in 1956, while James Lockhart published the Nahuatl text and a scholarly translation to English in 1991 in We People Here: Nahuatl Accounts of the Conquest of Mexico.

It is also variously known as Unos Annales Históricos de la Nación Mexicana ("Some Historical Annals of the Mexican Nation"), La relación anónima de Tlatelolco, “Manuscript 22”, and the "Tlatelolco Codex" (also a true codex called thus exists).

The manuscript is held at the Bibliothèque Nationale de France in Paris. The most important publications in Spanish are: the published one by Antigua Libreria de Robredo, Mexico 1948, introduction of Robert Barlow, translation and notes of Henrich Berlin; the most recent by Conaculta, Mexico 2002, translation of Rafael Tena, Col. Cien de México, 207pp. (ISBN 9703505074). Background on the text and a popular translation to English for classroom use can be found in The Broken Spears: The Aztec Account of the Conquest of Mexico by Miguel León-Portilla and Lysander Kemp.

The Manuscript is not fully preserved. Parts of the notebook and pages are damaged, and in the first notebook, pages one and four are missing. There happens to be missing pages in the second notebook as well, as the last two pages of it are completely blank, and the first page of the first notebook is missing. Also, Manuscript 22bis does not have a fifth chapter.

== Content ==
Chapter 2 includes multiple important events throughout the Tlatelolco (altepetl) people's history. It describes Tlatelolco’s defeat in the 1473 war against Tenochtitlan and the new government that the victors put in place afterward. It also recounts the death of Cuauhtemoc during the expedition of Hernan Cortes to the region of Hibueras. It concludes with the story of the famous Tlatelolco warrior Ecatzin

Because the text is written from Tlatelolco’s point of view, it mainly focuses on the bravery displayed by the Tlatelolco warriors during the war and conversely portrays the Tenochca cowardly. He even claimed that the reason for the Tenochca defeat was due to treason. He also discusses political leadership and explains why the war ended Tlatelolco’s royal dynasty (Nahuatl tlatocayotl). The rulers named after this period were now known as consuls (Nahuatl quauhtlatoque).

Like other writings from Tlatelolco, an anonymous writer wrote notes that accompanied the information. This unknown author wrote that when Cuauhtemoc came to power in 1515, the era of these consuls ended, and he became the city’s tlatoani. This chapter does not clarify how the change happened, and it also states that at this time Mexico was being ruled by someone named "Mexicatl Coztoololtic", which translates to “Plump Dwarf Calf”.

In the rest of the chapter, the author skips over the Spanish conquest and moves directly to Cortes’s expedition to what is known as Honduras. In this section, the text gives a detailed account of the executions of Cuauhtemoc, Coanacochtzin, and Tetlepanquetzal, who were the rulers of Tetzcoco and Tlacopan, saying that their deaths were caused by the betrayal of a Tenochca ally.

The final section includes a dialogue between Cortes, Malintzin, and two Tlatelolco warriors, Ecatzin and Temilotzin. Cortes tells them that he plans to take them to Spain, where they will eventually die. Temilotzin throws himself into the sea and dies, while Ectazin continues on to Castile (historical region). He returns about five years later around 1529. Now, he is a nobleman and the new tlatoani of Tlatelolco, though in reality he served as the city’s governor on behalf of the Spanish.

Because Ecatzin appears to be the central figure in this chapter, some scholars believe that he or someone close to him may have been responsible for initiating the writing of the history of Tlatelolco’s rulers.

Chapter 1, 3, and 4 are short and mainly consist of the lists of leaders and people in power from different cities. The most substantial and historically valuable section is chapter 6, which traces the history of the Aztecs from their departure from Chicomoztoc in the north all the way up to the time of the Spanish conquest. This chapter also includes excerpts from songs that describe the hardships that the Aztecs faced after arriving in the Valley of Mexico. In Aztec culture, songs were one of the main ways historical knowledge was passed down through oral tradition.

== Importance ==
This document is one of the most important sources on the history of the city state of Tlatelolco. It stands alongside other key materials such as the Uppsala Map from around 1556, the Tlatelolco codex written sometime between 1542 and 1560, the ordenanza del senor Cuauhtemoc written around 1555, and the Anales de la Conquista de Tlatelolco from 1473. Since most surviving accounts of pre-Columbian Mexican history were written from the viewpoint of the rulers of Tenochtitlan, the Anales de Tlatelolco are especially valuable because they offer a different, more localized perspective that complements the official Aztec narratives.

The document is also unique due to the fact that it is the only known source that provides the specific calendar day of when the Aztecs left Aztlan-Colhuacan and the day they founded Tenochtitlan.

Because the people of Tlatelolco saw themselves as a branch of the Aztecs (Mexica) that split off during their migration south, it is especially important to compare the differences between official Aztec histories and the same events told from Tlatelolco’s point of view. However, it is unclear how much the Anales’ version of Tlatelolco’s past may have been shaped by the major historical and religious reforms carried out in the Aztec Empire during the reigns of Itzcoatl, Motecuzoma Ilhuicamina, and Motecuzoma Xocoytzin.

Interestingly, the two most significant indigenous accounts of the Spanish conquest focus not on Tenochtitlan, the capital, but on Tlatelolco. After the conquest, Tlatelolco regained the local autonomy it had lost in 1473 when it was defeated by Tenochtitlan, and its ruling dynasty came to an end. New local governments began to challenge Spanish authorities over land and water rights, and older Aztec stories and were rewritten to support legal claims.

Because of this political context and the ways in which historical narratives were reshaped, it is difficult to fully determine how reliable the text of the Anales truly is.

== Publications ==
The Anales have been reissued and translated into many different languages. One of the most cited versions is the 1948 Spanish edition, introduced by Robert Barlow (R. H. Barlow) and translated and edited by Henrich Berlin. This edition was based on an earlier bilingual German version published by Ernst Mengin [in 1939. Mengin also released an exact copy of the Anales in 1945.

Fray Angel Maria Garibay Kintana published a Spanish translation of the codex in 1956. A critical English translation which also included the original Nahuatl, was produced by historian James Lockhart (historian) in 1991. Miguel Leon-Portilla and Lysander Kemp later released a widely read English version with educational materials in their book The Broken Spears: The Aztec Account of the Conquest of Mexico, which has been reprinted many times. One of the most recent editions is Rafael Tena’s Spanish translation

In addition to the full editions of the text, many scholars have published their own translations of specific sections dealing with the Spanish conquest of Mexico. Critical editions of the earliest historical fragments were released in 1997 by Hanns Prem and Ursula Dykerhoff, and two years later Susanne Klaus produced a bilingual Spanish edition.
