= Eugène Goupil =

French-Mexican philanthropist and collecto (1831-1896)

Charles Eugène Espidon Goupil (14 December 1831 – 24 October 1896) was a French-Mexican philanthropist and collector.

In 1889 he bought Joseph Marius Alexis Aubin's collection of 384 Mesoamerican manuscripts. On 14 May 1864, he married Augustine Élie. After Goupil's death, his wife donated the collection to the Bibliothèque Nationale in Paris.

== Family ==
On May 14, 1864, he married Augustine Elie. His grand-nephew was the painter Jean Charlot and his nephew by marriage was the son of Léon Harmel.
