= Martin Jankowski =

German writer and poet (born 1965)

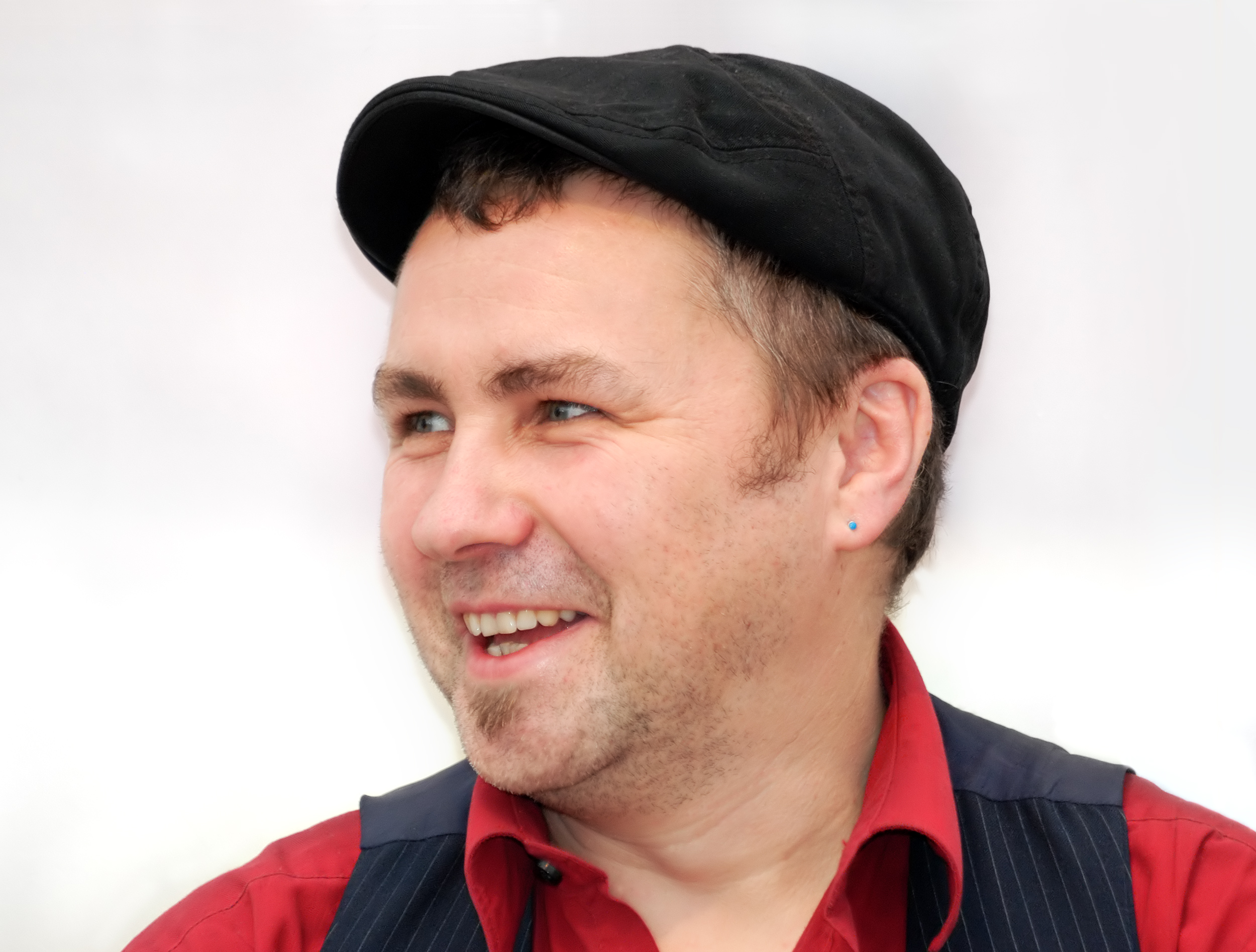
Martin Jankowski (2008)

Martin Jankowski (born 1965 in Greifswald) is a German writer and poet.

== Life ==
He grew up in Gotha and was part of the GDR's oppositional movement and participated in the legendary Monday demonstrations (that led to the fall of the Berlin Wall) of the 1980s in Leipzig as singer and poet. Besides numerous songs, poems and narrations he has also published texts for the stage, essays and one novel. He currently lives in Berlin. Since 2000 he worked as author and curator for several museums and international art projects, amongst them the legendary Heinz Berggruen Collection and the Ethnological Museum of Berlin. In the spring of 2003 he was guest lecturer for new German literature in Indonesia at the Universitas Indonesia. From 2001 to 2004 he was also involved in the coordination of the internationales literaturfestival berlin, later he curated the “Specials” section of this festival. From November 2003 to May 2004, he was chairman of the Deutsch-Indonesisches Kulturinstitut in Berlin and since May 2004 hosts the “Literatursalon am Kollwitzplatz“ for the literary magazine ndl. Since November 2005, he is also chairman of the Berliner Literarische Aktion.

In 2006, he received the Alfred-Döblin-grant of the Academy of Arts, Berlin and undertook a reading tour through Indonesia sponsored by the IndonesiaTera foundation and the German embassy. From 2007 to 2010 he also hosted the “Literatursalon Mitte” in Berlin's historical quarter Scheunenviertel and since 2012 also the "Literatursalon Karlshorst". Besides these numerous activities, Jankowski regularly works as editor and theatre director. 2011 he directed the "Jakarta Berlin Arts Festival" in Berlin. Outside Germany he had been invited to reading tours and cultural festivals in Austria, Brasil, Chile, Finland, Indonesia, Italy, the Netherlands, Russia, the UK, and the United States and he gave numerous guest lectures on literature and history at several universities in Chile, Indonesia, Italy and the USA.

== Works ==
- Rabet oder Das Verschwinden einer Himmelsrichtung. Roman. München: via verbis, 1999. ISBN 3-933902-03-7
- Frische Knochen aus Banyuwangi - the poems of Agus R. Sarjono (translated into German by Berthold Damshäuser and Inge Dumpél, edited and with an essay by Martin Jankowski, 2003). ISBN 3-933149-31-2
- Seifenblasenmaschine – Berliner Szenen. Tales and short stories. Hamburg; Berlin: Schwartzkopff Buchwerke, 2005. ISBN 3-937738-32-0
- Indonesisches Sekundenbuch. Poems, bilingual (Indonesian-German), translation by Katrin Bandel, Indonesian adaptation by Dorothea Rosa Herliany, introduction by Goenawan Mohamad, Magelang (Java): Indonesiatera, 2006. ISBN 92-97750-01-X
- Mäuse. Short novel, SuKuLTur Verlag, Schöner Lesen No. 53, Berlin 2006. ISBN 3-937737-60-X
- Der Tag, der Deutschland veränderte - 9. Oktober 1989. Essay. Series published by the Sächsischer Landesbeauftragter für die Stasiunterlagen No. 7, Leipzig 2007. ISBN 978-3-374-02506-0
- U(DYS)TOPIA - myths, legends & fairy tales in arts. In German, English and Indonesian language. Regiospectra Verlag, Berlin 2010, ISBN 978-3-940132-14-7.
- Jakarta Berlin. Cultural essays in German and English language, Regiospectra Verlag, Berlin 2011, ISBN 978-3-940132-28-4.
- sekundenbuch - gedichte & gesänge. Poems, Leipziger Literaturverlag, Leipzig 2012, ISBN 978-3-86660-144-4.
- Indonesien lesen - Notizen zu Literatur und Gesellschaft. Essays and Interviews, Regiospectra Verlag, Berlin 2014, ISBN 978-3-940132-66-6.
- kosmonautenwalzer. Poems, artist book with graphic illustrations by Wienke Treblin, MLB 108, aphaia publishing, Berlin 2014.
- sasakananas INDONESIEN MATERIAL. Poems & notes. Leipziger Literaturverlag, Leipzig 2015, ISBN 978-3-86660-197-0.
- Nachtbus nach Mitte - Berliner Gedichte von heute. Edited and with texts of Martin Jankowski, Verlag für Berlin und Brandenburg, Berlin 2016, ISBN 978-3-945256-55-8.

== Awards ==
- open mike 1993
- author's grant by the Stiftung Kulturfonds 1996
- working grant of the Berlin Senate 1997
- annual award of the DVLG (Jahrespreis für Literaturwissenschaft und Geistesgeschichte der DVLG) 1998
- grant (Alfred Döblin Stipendium) of the German Akademie der Künste 2006
- working grant of the Berlin Senate 2007
- grant for cultural exchange 2008
- literary award of the V.Baum Foundation Berlin (for the lyrical lifework) 2013

== Literature ==
- Grub, Frank Thomas: 'Wende' und 'Einheit' im Spiegel der deutschsprachigen Literatur (5.3.7. pp.). Berlin, New York: de Gruyter, 2003.
- Grant, Janet L.: "Post-Prenzlauer Berg", in: Exberliner No. 53. Berlin, 2007.
- Kürschners Deutscher Literaturkalender, K.G. Saur Verlag, Berlin, 2006/2007.
