= Agus R. Sarjono =

Indonesian poet and author (born 1962)

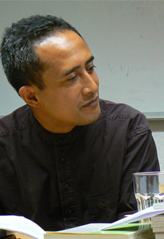

Agus R. Sarjono (born 27 July 1962 in Bandung, West Java, Indonesia) is an Indonesian poet and author. In 1988, he graduated from Department of Indonesian Literature of IKIP Bandung, and then finished his postgraduate program in Universitas Indonesia at the faculty of literature and cultural studies in 2002.

He writes poems, short stories, essays, critics, and drama, which have been published in Indonesia, Malaysia, Brunei, and several journals in Germany, France, Netherlands, Poland, England, and the United States. His poems are included in more than twenty anthologies.

He works as a lecturer in the Theatre Department of STSI Bandung, as an editor of the literary magazine, Horison, and as the Program Director of The Jakarta Arts Council for the period of 2002–2006. He was a writer-in-residence at the International Institute for Asian Studies (IIAS) in Leiden from February through October 2001, courtesy of Poets of All Nations Foundation. From December 2002 to March 2003 he stayed in Langenbroich, Germany, as a guest writer of The Heinrich-Böll-Foundation.

== Works ==
=== Poetry ===
- Kenduri Airmata (Tears Feast, 1994, 1996);
- Suatu Cerita dari Negeri Angin (A Story from the Country of the Wind, 2001, 2003);
- A Story from the Country of the Wind (English edition, 2001).
- Frische Knochen aus Banyuwangi (translated into German by Berthold Damshäuser and Inge Duempel, edited by Martin Jankowski, Berlin 2003). ISBN 3-933149-31-2
- Diterbangkan Kata-kata (Flying by Words, 2005);

=== Essay ===
- Bahasa dan Bonafiditas Hantu (Language and The Bonafidity of Ghosts, 2001);
- Sastra dalam Empat Orba (Literature in The Four Stages of New Order Regime, 2001).

=== Drama ===
- Atas Nama Cinta (In the Name of Love, 2004).

=== Conferences, festivals and readings ===
- “Asean Writers Conference” in Manila (1995)
- “Istiqlal International Poetry Reading”, Jakarta (1995)
- “Ipoh Arts Festival III”, Negeri Perak, Malaysia (1998)
- “The Netherlands-Indonesian Poetry Night” in Erasmus Huis, Jakarta (1998)
- “Festival de Winternachten”, Den Haag (1999 and 2005)
- “Poetry on the Road”, Bremen (2001)
- “internationales literaturfestival berlin” (international literature festival berlin) (2001).
- "The Dubai International Poetry Festival" (2009)
- He has also recited poems and discussion in several universities and art centers in Germany, France, The Netherlands, Finland, Egypt, Thailand, Malaysia and Brunei Darussalam.

=== As editor ===
- Saini KM: Puisi dan Beberapa Masalahnya/Poetry and Some of its Problematics (1993)
- Catatan Seni/Notes on Arts (1996)
- Kapita Selekta Teater /Capita Selecta Theater (1996)
- Pembebasan Budaya-budaya Kita /The Liberation of Our Cultures (1999)
- Horison Sastra Indonesia 1-4/ The Horizon of Indonesian Literature 1-4 (2002), Horison Esai Indonesia 1-2 /The Horizon of Indonesian Essays 1-2 (2004)
- Teater tanpa Masa Silam / Theatre without previous times (2005)
