= Mengin =

Mengin is a surname. Notable people with the surname include:

- Aurelia Mengin, Reunion film director
- Charles Mengin (1853–1933), French painter
- Christophe Mengin (born 1968), French cyclist
- Ernst Mengin (1893–1973), German Mesoamericanist
- Félix Mengin, French trader, temporary French consul and writer
