= Berliner Literarische Aktion =

German literary organization

Berliner Literarische Aktion (Berlin Literary Action) is a literary organization based in Berlin.

== History and functions ==
The association was founded in 2005 by a network of international literary activists (authors, translators, literary scholars and coordinators), chaired by the writer Martin Jankowski. The Berliner Literarische Aktion produces and disseminates different forms of literary presentation and performance, creates public platforms for German and international literature and supports international cultural exchange as well as cross-genre art productions. The non-profit incorporated association maintains an office on a volunteer basis in Berlin.

Employees and partners develop new forms of literary events and create public spaces for the presentation of German and international contemporary literature with specially designed lectures, festivals, debates, performances, symposiums, charity events, art, etc. Multilingual events and the support of the two-way publication of translations encourage international cultural exchange in which theater, visual arts and music also play a role besides literature. In addition to public performances and exhibitions, own publications are also developed. As part of regular educational work, new recipient groups for literature are targeted (youth work, prison readings, etc.). Fundamental to this is the view that literature in the multimedia age more than ever possesses big social effects whose powers have to be developed actively.

== Projects ==
The Berliner Literarische Aktion organizes regular literary salons in the city of Berlin (Literatursalon Karlshorst, Der Berliner Weltliteratursalon, Wahlverwandtschaften im Maschinenhaus, Literatursalon am Kollwitzplatz, Literatursalon Mitte), similar events have been organized in Italy and Indonesia. Online literary Magazine Stadtsprachen, freely accessible to everyone, introduces and publishes Berlin's current multilingual contemporary literature. More than 167 international Berlin authors are presented there with altogether over 200 texts in 30 languages - also in German translation - and new ones are constantly being added. The Berliner Literarische Aktion promotes cultural exchange and organizes various Literary Festivals that connect artists coming different languages, countries and artistic expressions.

Of international importance are the multi-lingual presentation forms of poetry slams, which are realized regularly with renowned partners (e.g. 2002-2010 "The international SLAM!Revue") at the Berlin International Literature Festival. The association's development of a new type of slam event the "Slam Revue" in 2002 has since found countless imitators worldwide. The program "Literature behind bars", which was initially developed only for prisons in Berlin and brings international authors in contact with detainees, also attracted interest and found imitators all over Europe. As a result, the Berliner Literarische Aktion participated in research projects of the European Union on cultural education in prisons. In order to stimulate global literary exchange, the Berliner Literarische Aktion designs and implements international, explicitly non-commercial types of events every year (including Italy, Indonesia, Switzerland, France, Poland, Great Britain, Brazil, Chile, Russia).

== Partners ==
In addition to local partners such as the Humboldt University of Berlin, the Akademie der Künste and the Senate of Berlin, the Berliner Literarische Aktion works together with various international partners, including the Goethe Institut, the British Council, the DAAD, the GIZ, the European Commission or the OECD. Besides educational institutions, embassies and cultural institutes the regular partners are publishers (such as Suhrkamp Verlag, cookbooks) and authors, e.g. Nicholas Shakespeare, DBC Pierre, Nancy Huston and many others more.

== Publications ==
- U(DYS)TOPIA – the emergence of myths, fairy tales and legends in contemporary Indonesia and German. German, English, Indonesian. Edited and with essays by Martin Jankowski, Regiospectra publishing, Berlin 2010, ISBN 978-3-940132-14-7.
- Jakarta Berlin, German and English. Edited and with essays und photos by Martin Jankowski, Regiospectra publishing, Berlin 2011, ISBN 978-3-940132-28-4.
- Art and Culture in Prison, English with abstracts in German, Catalan and Italian. Edited by Fondazione Michellucci, Fiesole/Florence 2012. ISBN 978-88-907780-1-8.
- Nachtbus nach Mitte - Berliner Gedichte von heute. Edited by Martin Jankowski, Birger Hoyer. Verlag für Berlin und Brandenburg, Berlin 2016. ISBN 978-3-945256-55-8.
