= Konrad Theodor Preuss =

German ethnologist

- Born: November 23, 1869; Preußisch-Eylau
- Died: June 8, 1938 (aged 68)
- Occupation: Ethnologist

Academic work
- Notable students: Ernst Mengin

Konrad Theodor Preuss (June 2, 1869 – June 8, 1938) was a German ethnologist. He was chairman of the Lithuanian Literary Society (1890–98).

Preuss was born in Preußisch-Eylau. After studying at the Albertina in Königsberg in Prussia and at Frederick William's University of Berlin he joined the Ethnological Museum of Berlin in 1895, advancing to director of the Central and North American department in 1920, before retiring in 1934. He also became a member of the faculty of the University of Berlin (1948 renamed as Humboldt University) and died in Berlin.

He became foreign member of the Royal Netherlands Academy of Arts and Sciences in 1928.

== Works ==
- Die geistige Kultur der Naturvölker. Leipzig, 1914
- Grammatik der Cora-Sprache, Columbia, New York 1932
