= Uli figure =

Wooden statue from New Ireland in Papua New Guinea

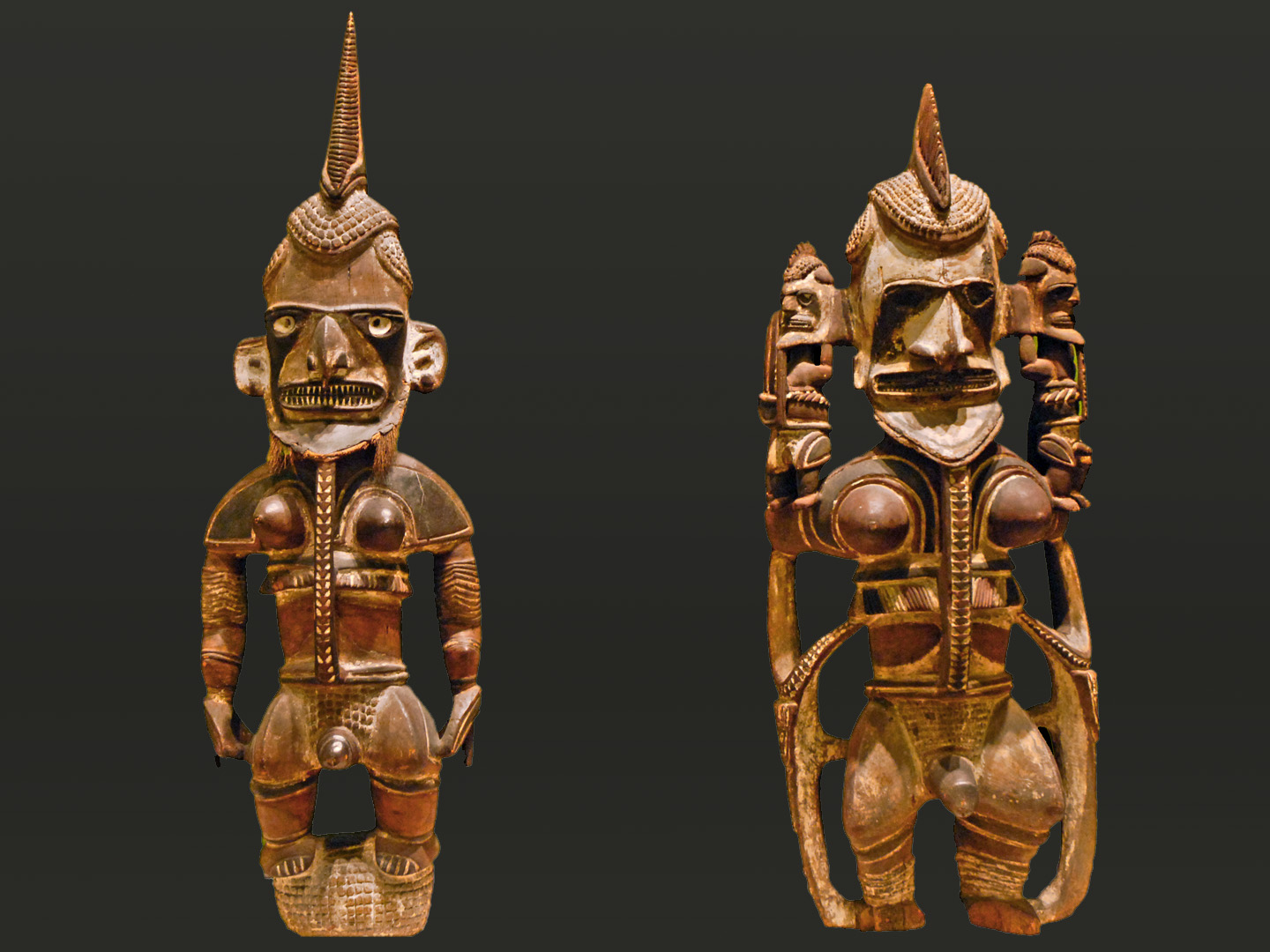
Uli figures from New Ireland, 19th century (Ethnological Museum of Berlin).

Uli figures are wooden statues from New Ireland in Papua New Guinea. Like their neighbors to the north and south, the artistic traditions of the peoples of central New Ireland formerly focused largely around mortuary rites. In contrast to the intricate malagan carvings of the north, artists in central New Ireland produced less ornate but more permanent figures known as uli, which were kept and reused many times. No longer made today, uli were displayed as part of lengthy fertility rites involving the exhumation and reburial of human skulls, which accompanied the planting of sacred plants.

When a newly carved uli was brought out, a shaman assisted in inducing the spirit of the deceased chief to enter the carving, and after the ceremony, the work was kept in the "men's house" where it would continue to aid the successor and his people.

Uli figures appear hermaphroditic, having both a phallus and prominent breasts. This blending of male and female features possibly symbolized the fertile and nourishing powers of clan leaders, who were expected to provide for the other members of the clan. The Uli figures probably symbolized the connection between paternal and maternal life energy in initiation ceremonies.

== Sources ==
- New Ireland: art of the South Pacific by Michael Gunn, Philippe Peltier, St. Louis Art Museum, Musée du quai Branly, Ethnologisches Museum Berlin (2006) ISBN 88-7439-369-5
- Ritual arts of Oceania, New Ireland: in the collections of the Barbier-Mueller Museum by Musée Barbier-Mueller, Michael Gunn, Pierre-Alain Ferrazzini, Mona Bismarck Fondation (1994)
- Assemblage of spirits: idea and image in New Ireland by Louise Lincoln, Minneapolis Institute of Arts (1987) ISBN 0-8076-1187-5
- The iconology of the Uli figure of central New Ireland by Philip Collins Gifford (1974)
