= Saini KM =

Indonesian writer

Saini KM (born June 16, 1938, in Sumedang, West Java) is an Indonesian writer. He is known for his award-winning dramas, and has also written poetry, prose and non-fiction. He served as literature editor of the newspaper Pikiran Rakyat; as a lecturer at the Indonesian Academy of Dance in Bandung, and sat on the Bandung Regional People's Representative Council. He has won numerous awards for his work, including most recently the SEA Write Award (2011). He has been called "one of the leading playwrights of the New Order".
