= Ethnological Museum of Berlin =

Museum in Berlin, Germany

Ethnologisches Museum Berlin, part of the Staatliche Museen zu Berlin Stiftung Preußischer Kulturbesitz (often translated as Ethnological Museum)
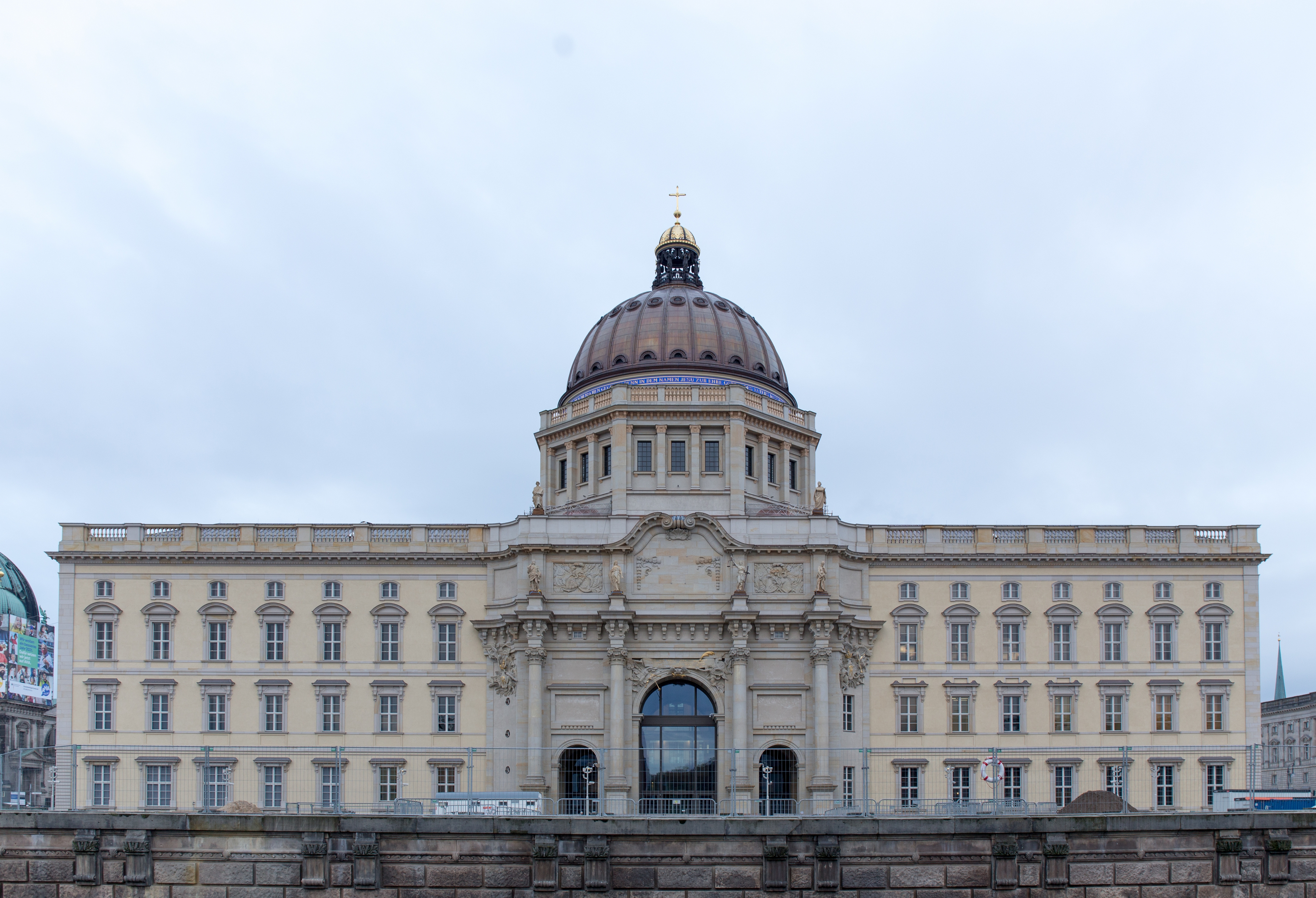

- Location of Ethnological Museum in Berlin, Germany Ethnological Museum of Berlin (Germany)
- Former name: Museum für Völkerkunde Berlin-Dahlem
- Established: Original in 1873, new building in 1886, and after World War II rebuilt in present form in 1970
- Location: Mitte
- Coordinates: 52.5175°N 13.402778°E
- Type: Ethnological
- Director: Viola König
- Website: Ethnologisches Museum

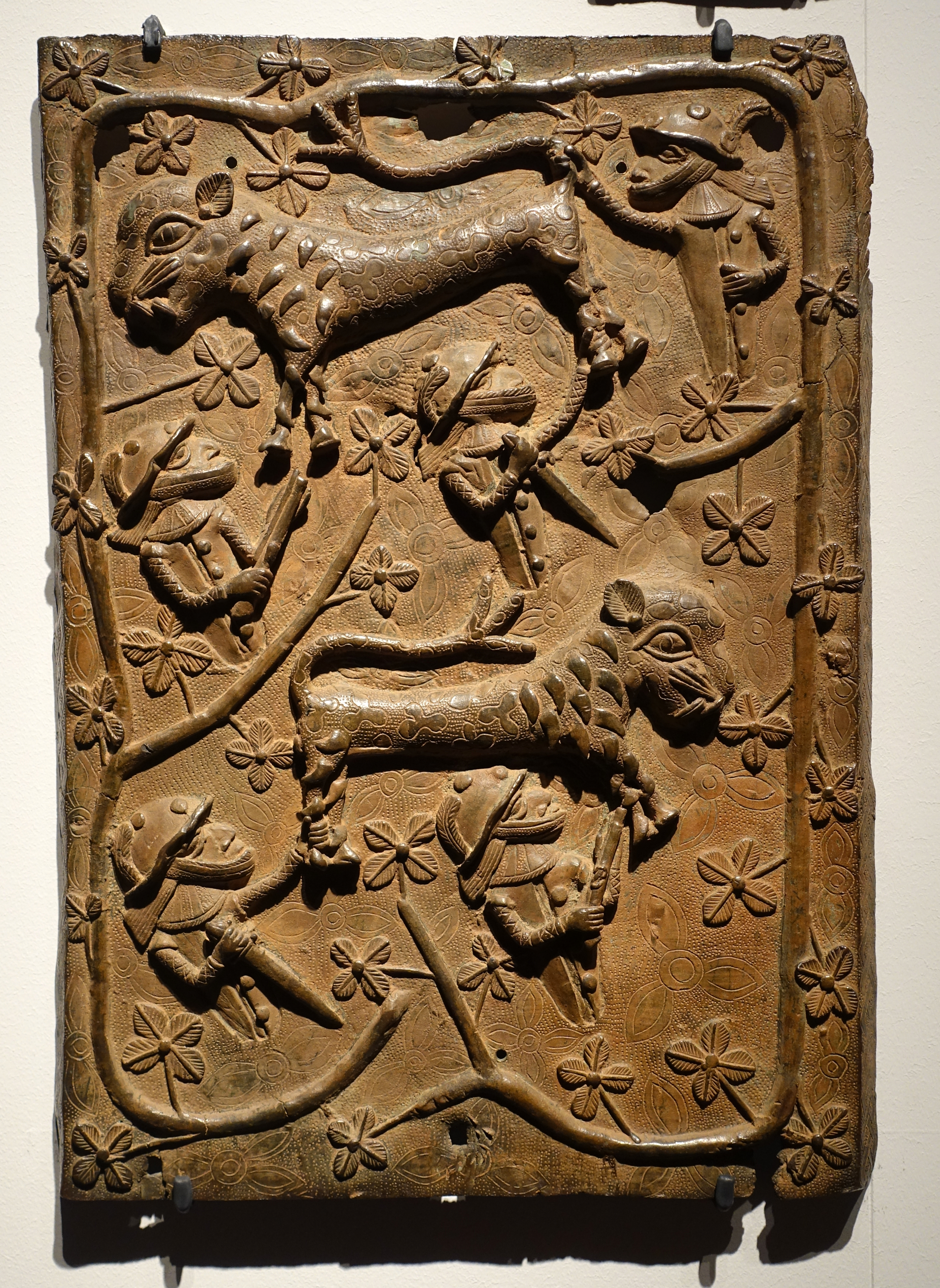
The Leopard Hunt, 16th–17th century, Kingdom of Benin

The Ethnologisches Museum Berlin (English: Ethnological Museum of Berlin) is an ethnological museum, part of the Staatliche Museen zu Berlin Stiftung Preußischer Kulturbesitz Berlin (English: State Museums of the Prussian Heritage Foundation), the de facto national collection of the Federal Republic of Germany. Its exhibitions are located in the Humboldt Forum in Mitte, along with the Museum für Asiatische Kunst (English: Museum of Asian Arts).

The museum holds more than 500,000 objects and is one of the world's largest important collections of works of art and culture from outside Europe. Its highlights include objects from the Sepik River, Hawaii, the Kingdom of Benin, Cameroon, Congo, Tanzania, China, the Pacific Coast of North America, Mesoamerica, the Andes, as well as one of the first ethnomusicology collections of sound recordings (the Berliner Phonogramm-Archiv).

== History ==
The Ethnologisches Museum was founded in 1873 and opened its doors in 1886 as the Royal Museum for Ethnology (German: Königliches Museum für Völkerkunde), but its roots go back to the 17th-century Kunstkammer of the rulers of Brandenburg-Prussia. As the museum’s collections expanded in the early 20th century, the museum quickly outgrew its facility in the center of Berlin on Königgrätzer Straße (today named Stresemannstraße). A new building was erected in the suburb of Dahlem to house the museum’s store rooms and research collections. In World War II, the main building of the museum was heavily damaged. It was demolished in 1961, and the buildings in Dahlem (in what was then West Berlin) were reconfigured to serve as the museum's exhibition spaces.

Following German reunification, although many of the Berlin museum collections were relocated, the collections of the Ethnologisches Museum remained in Dahlem. Starting in 2000, concrete plans were developed to move the collections back to the center of the city. In 2021, the Ethnologisches Museum and Museum für Asiatische Kunst were reopened in the new Humboldt Forum in the reconstructed Berlin City Palace (German: Berliner Stadtschloss) immediately south of the main Museum Island complex.

== Collections ==
Beginning in January 2016, the Ethnologisches Museum began the process of dismantling its exhibitions in preparation for its move to the Humboldt Forum. The exhibitions in Dahlem were closed in January 2017. Until then, the permanent exhibitions displayed works from Africa, Mesoamerican archaeology, and South Asia. Highlights included the collections of painted Maya vases and drinking cups, the Lienzo Seler Coixtlahuaca II, Benin Bronzes, sculptures from Cameroon, and power figures from the Democratic Republic of the Congo.

The collections themselves encompass more than 500,000 from around the world. In addition, the museum holds more than 280,000 historical photographs, a substantial archive, more than 125,000 sound recordings, and 20,000 ethnographic films. The collection is organized according to geography as well as methodological approaches. The main divisions are Africa, Oceania, East-and North-Asia, South and Southeast Asia, the Middle East and Central Asia, American ethnology, American archaeology, and ethnomusicology. The museum also houses a specialized reference library of more than 140,000 volumes relating to ethnology, non-European art, and global art.

The new exhibitions of the Ethnological Museum in the Humboldt Forum were opened successively in 2021 and 2022 with a delay due to the Covid 19 pandemic.

At the Ethnologisches Museum in Berlin Dahlem, many objects in the collection made of organic materials such as wood, raffia, or feathers were treated with chemicals for conservation purposes. As a result, many of these objects are now contaminated and pose a serious health risk when handled by humans.

=== Repatriation of stolen artifacts ===
In 2021, the museum announced plans to return some of its holding of Nigerian artifacts, including a large collection of Benin Bronzes, to Nigeria. The Bronzes had been looted during the British Benin Expedition of 1897.

==== Restitution of 23 cultural objects to Namibia ====
In 2022, the museum returned 23 cultural objects to Namibia as part of the collaborative project Confronting Colonoal Pasts, Envisioning Creative Futures initiated in 2019 with the Museums Association of Namibia, focused on provenance research, cultural heritage restitution and collaboration between German and Namibian museum professionals The items were taken between 1884 and 1915, when Namibia was part of the German Empire colony German South West Africa.

The objects returned included historical clothing, jewelry, tools and everyday items selected by Namibian experts for their historical, cultural and aesthetic significance They initially arrived in Namibia as loans for further research in May 2022. In June 2022, the Prussian Cultural Heritage Foundation authorised arrangements for their permanent return, and an agreement transferring ownership to Namibia was signed in April 2024

This project also supported the development of Namibia's museum sector, including the establishment of the Museum of Namibian Fashion in Otjiwarongo bringing together Namibian artists, scholars and cultural eritage professionals. In April 2024, the National Art Gallery of Namibia hosted the exhibition Reconnecting with Returned Cultural Belongings, presenting the 23 objects alongside research and artistic interpretations developed through the project.

== Selected works ==
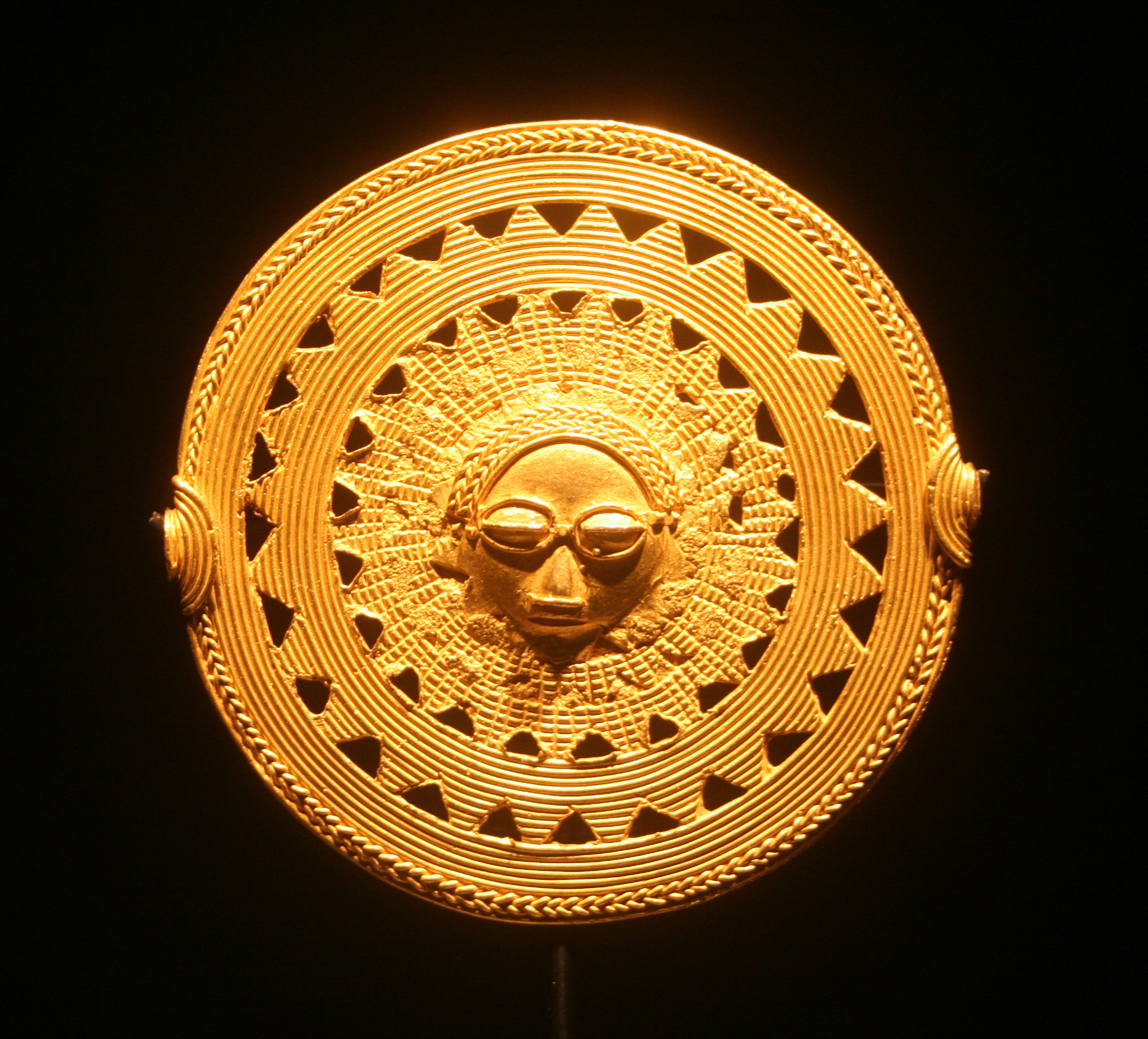
Gold pendant from West Africa

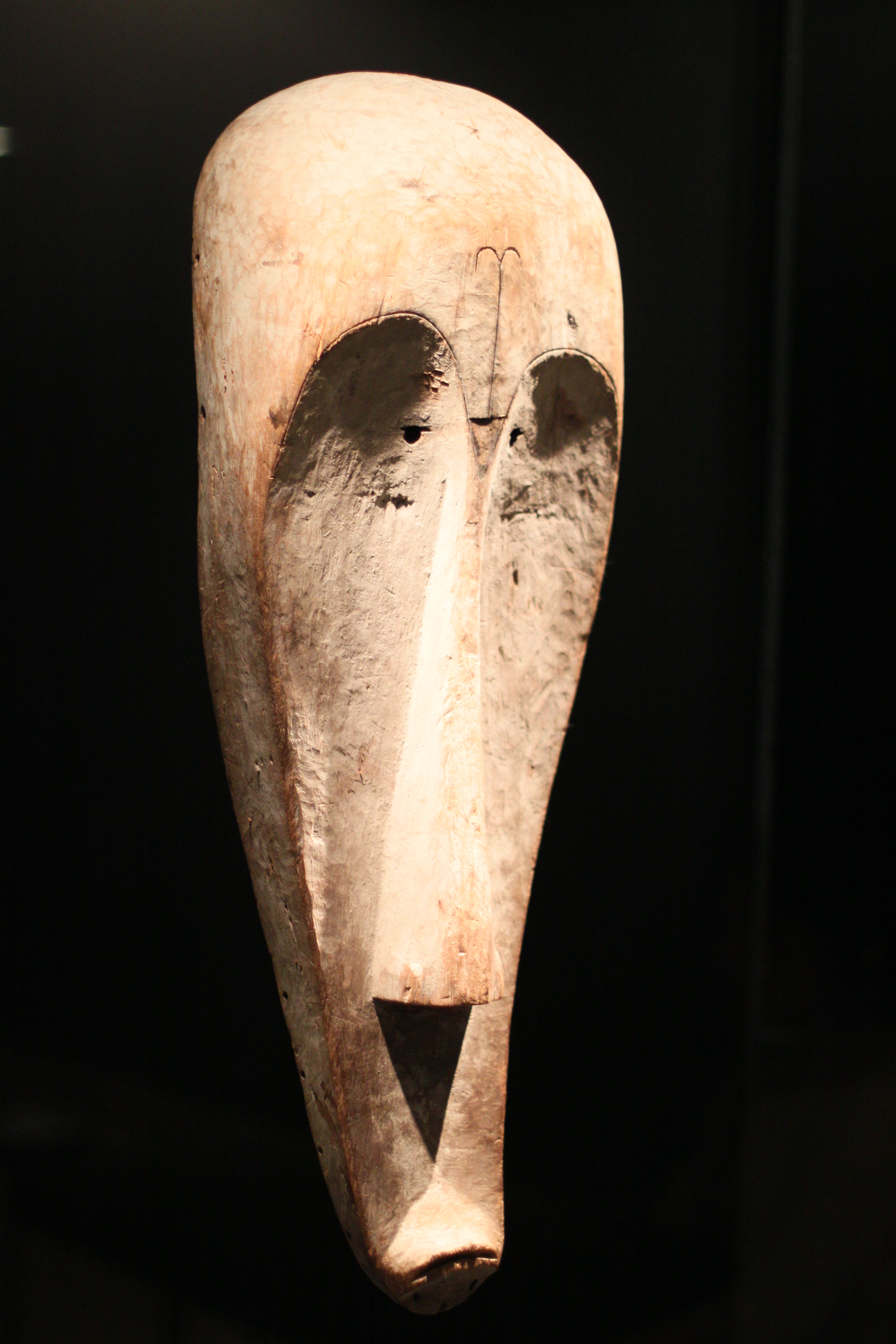
Fang Ngil mask from Cameroon/Gabon

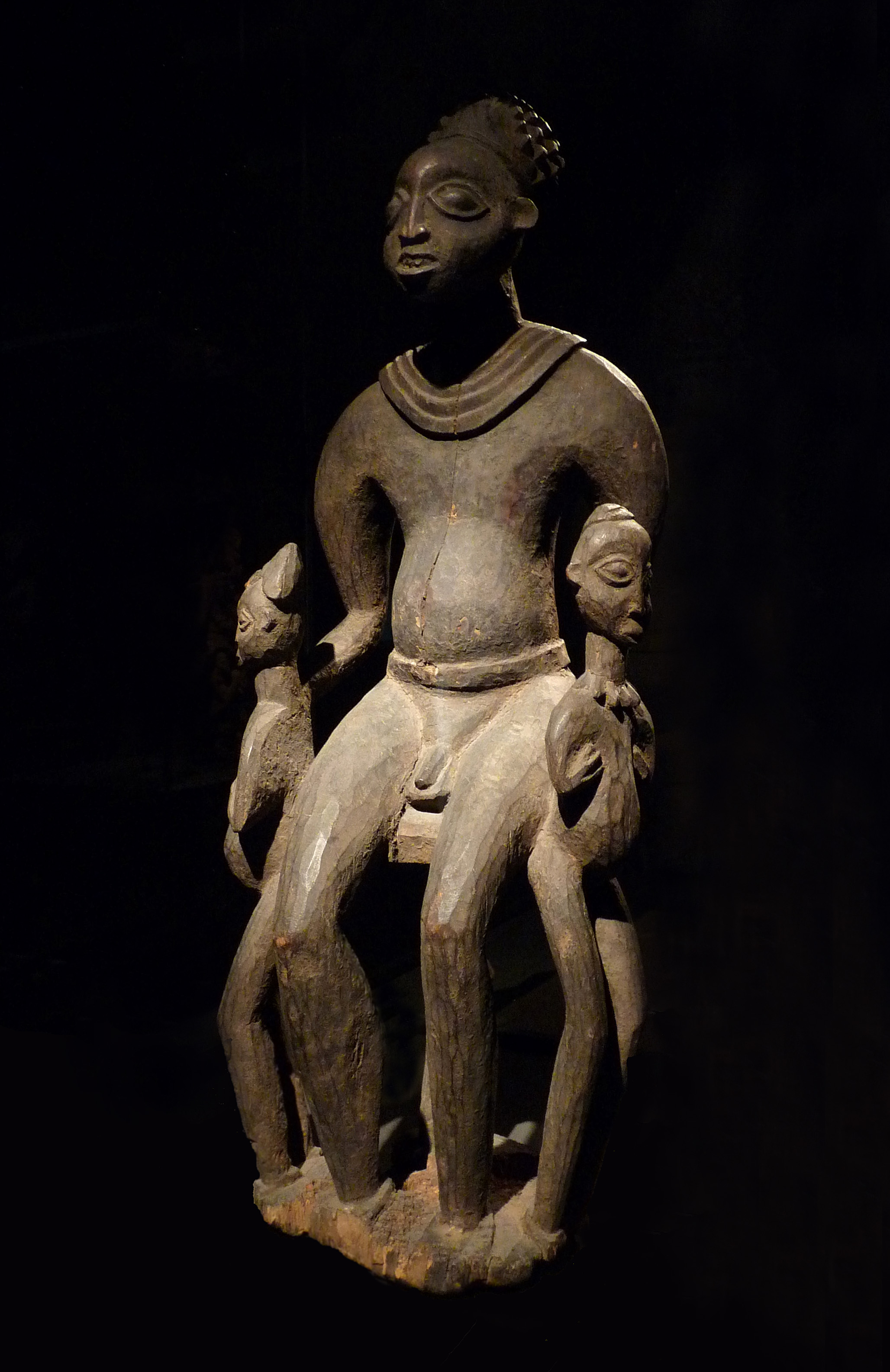
Statue of a Bangwa king with twins

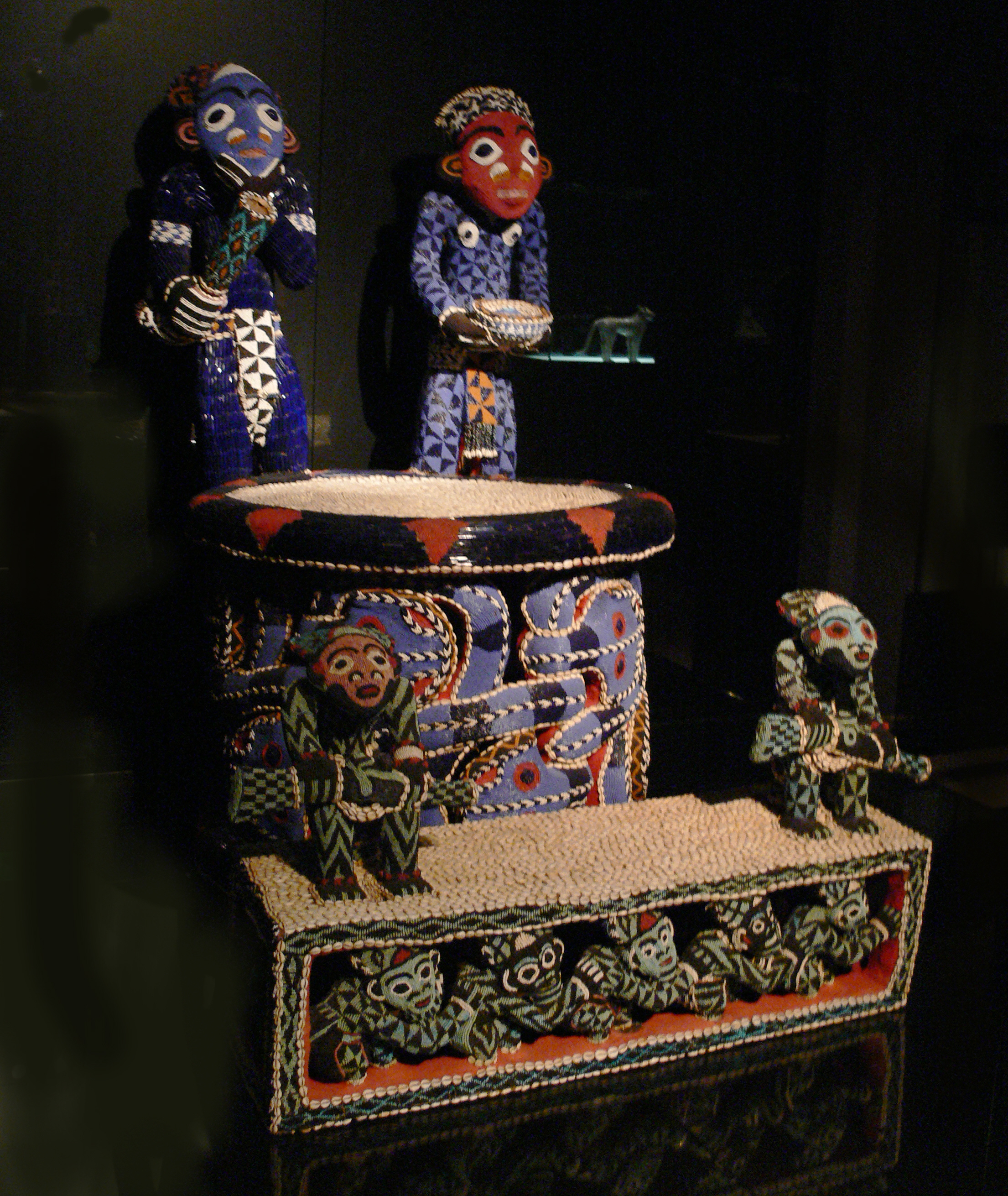
Throne of King Nsangu of Bamum ('Mandu Yenu')

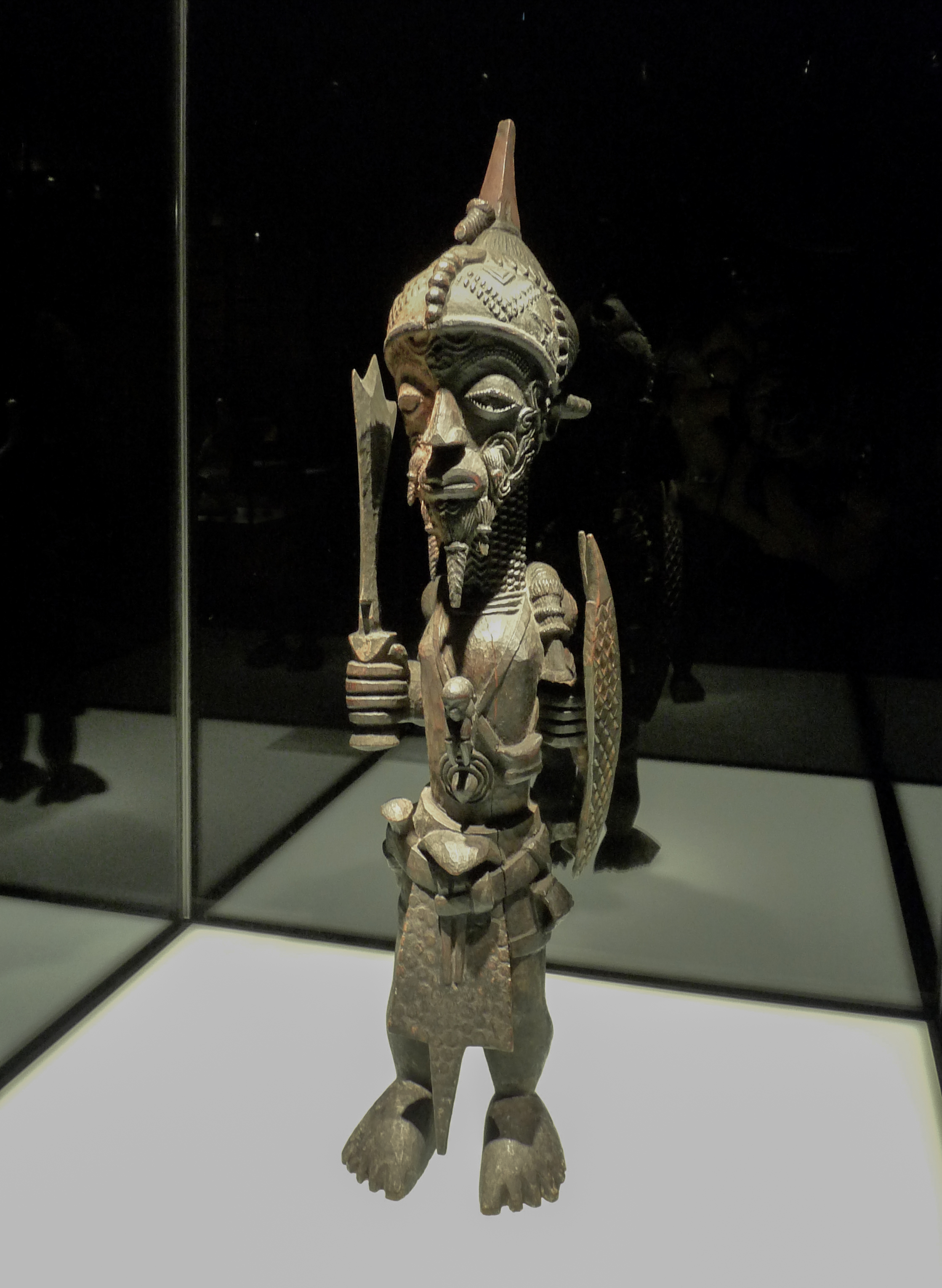
Lulua figure (the Leopard chief)

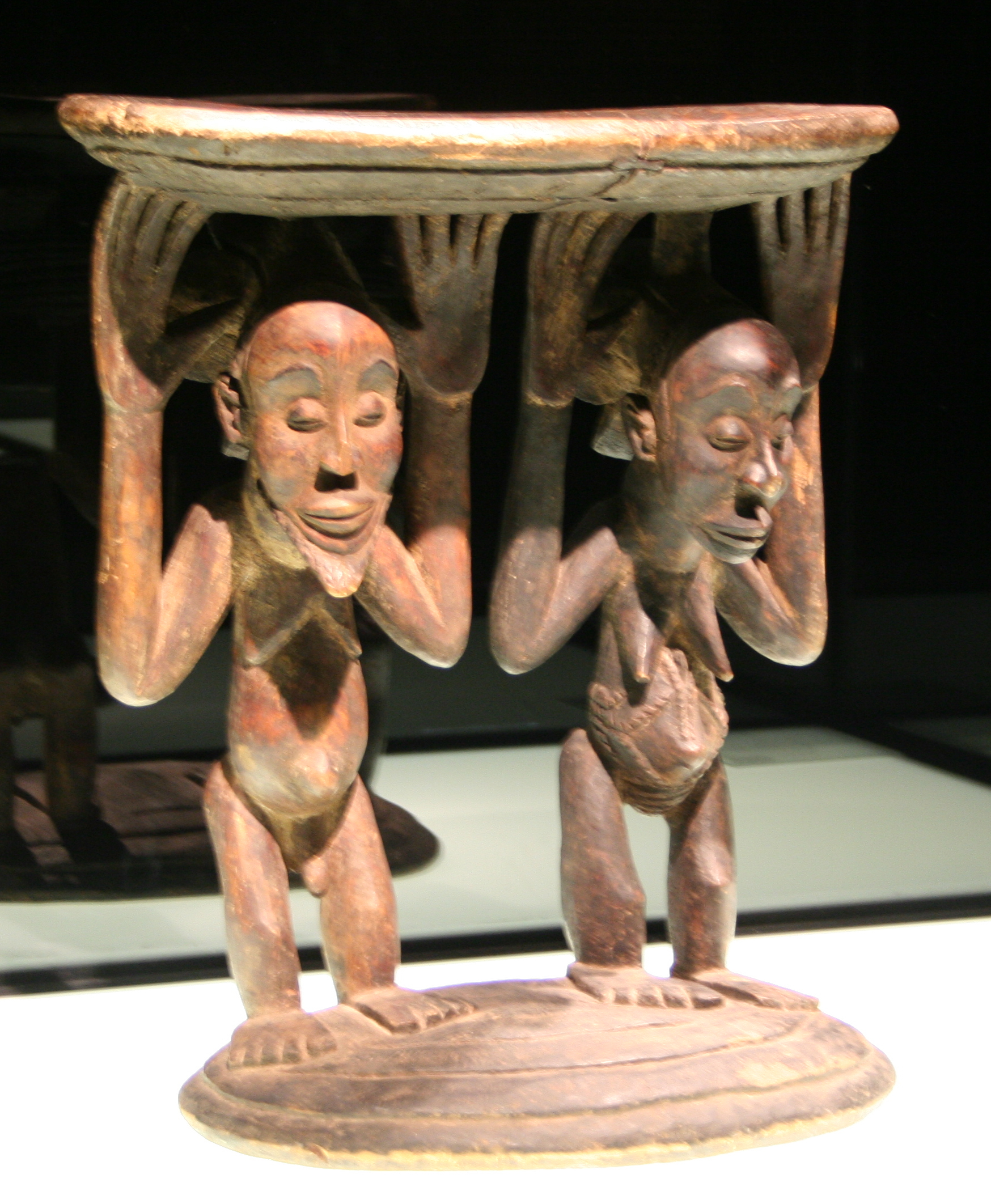
Seat with ancestral figures

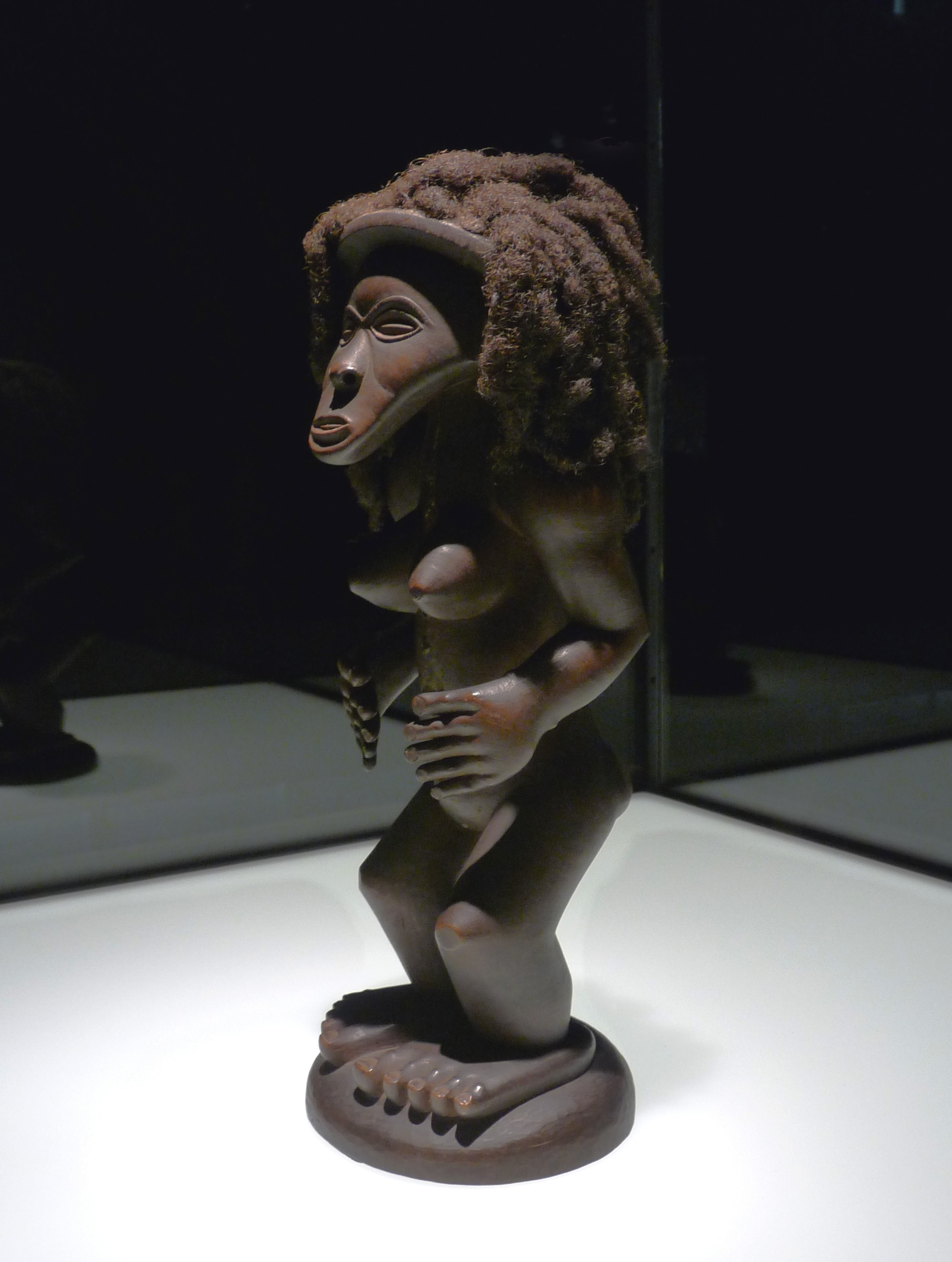
Chokwe figure of a queen or queen mother

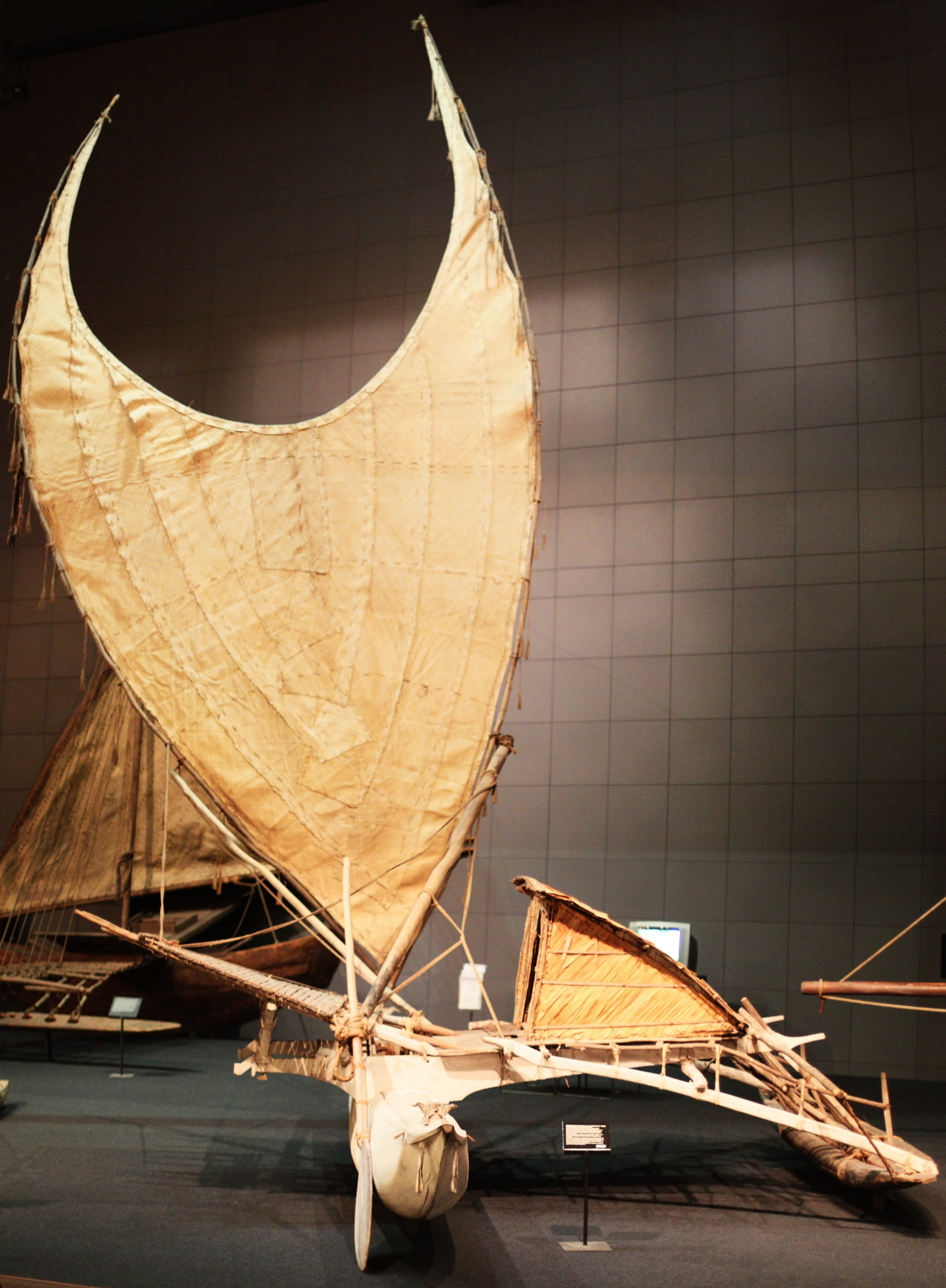
Tepukei (ocean-going outrigger canoe) from the Santa Cruz Islands collected by Dr Gerd Koch

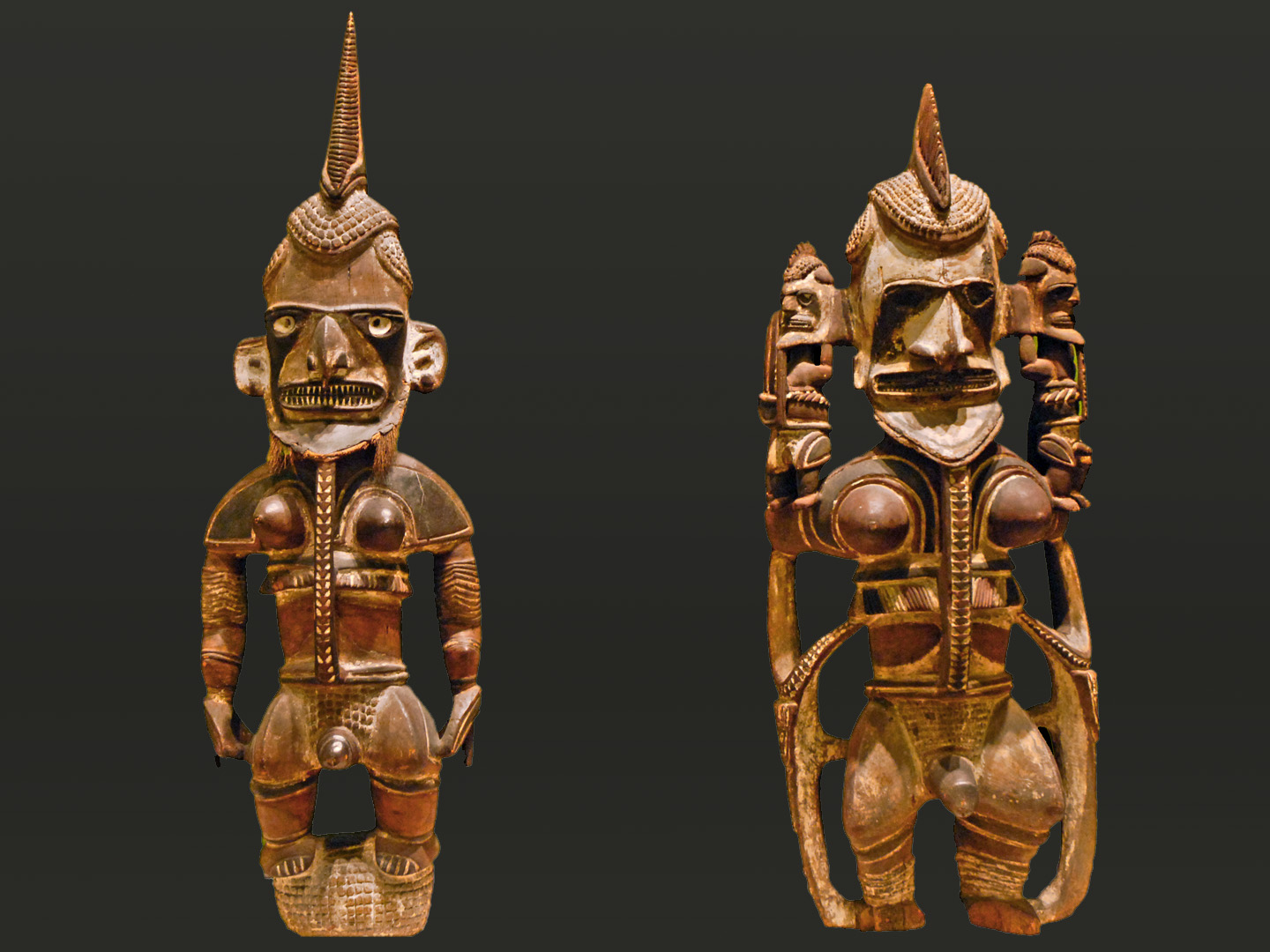
Uli Figures

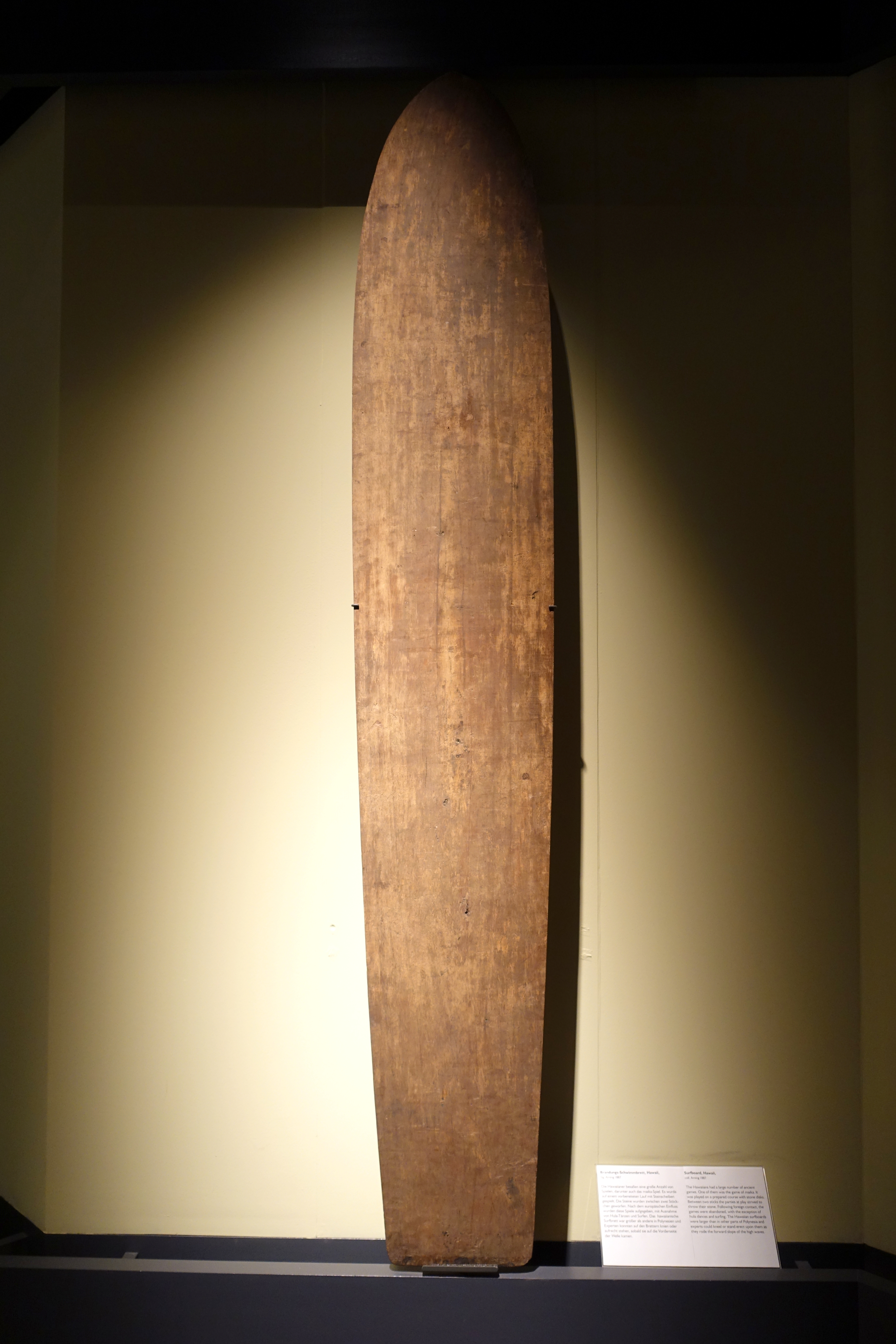
Hawaiian surfboard from 1887

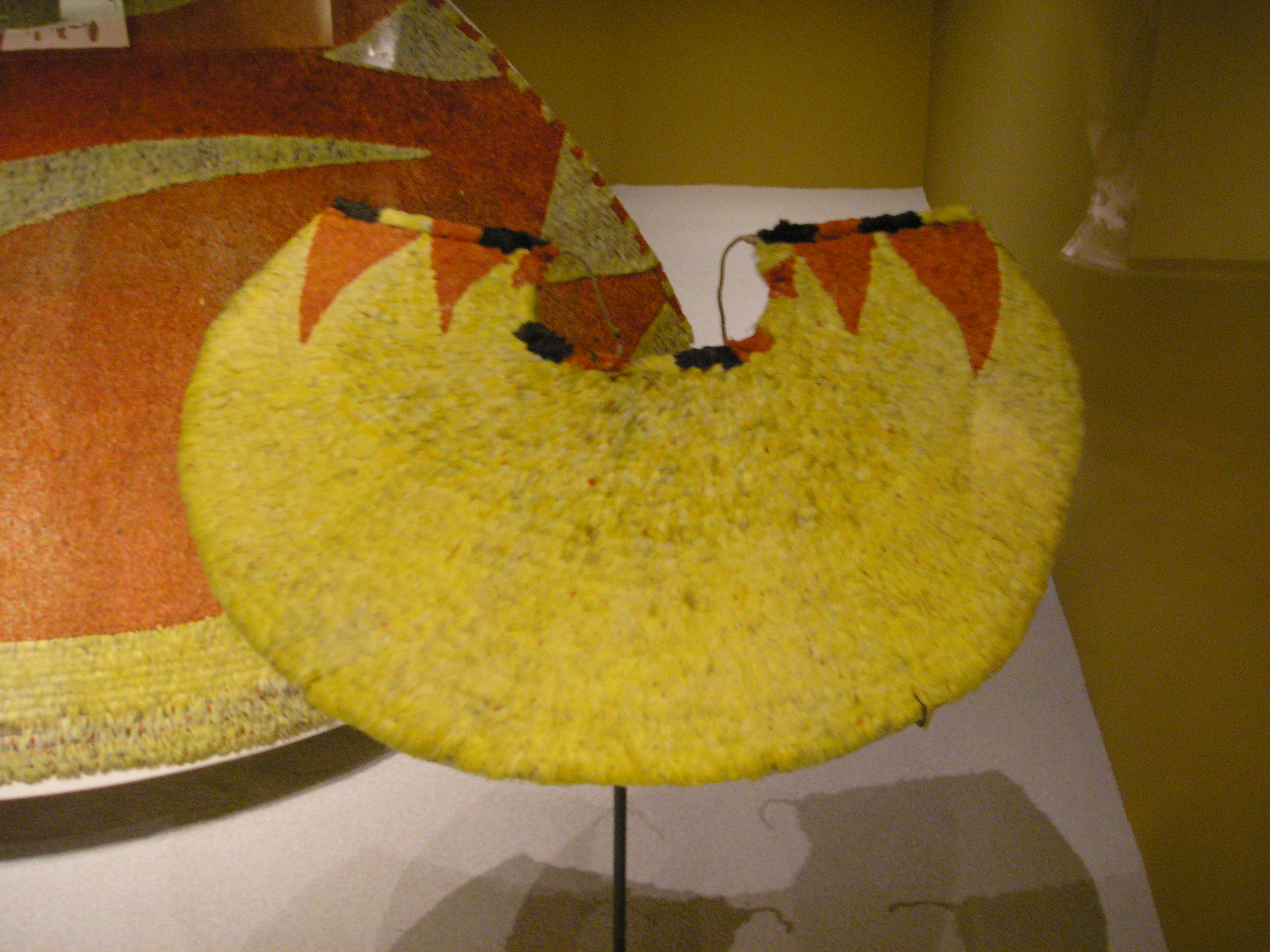
Feather capes from Hawaii

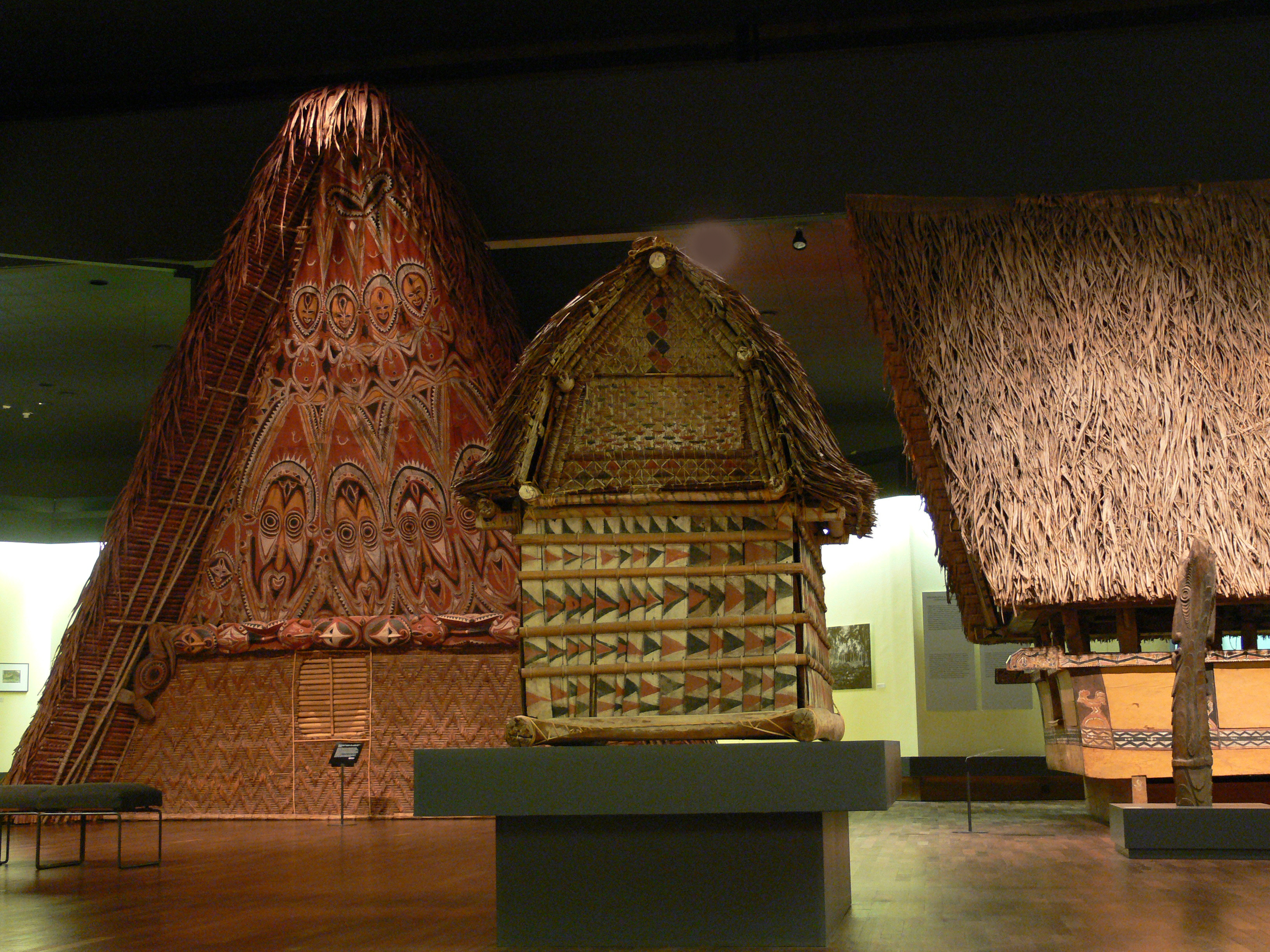
The Melanesian room, with reconstructed houses

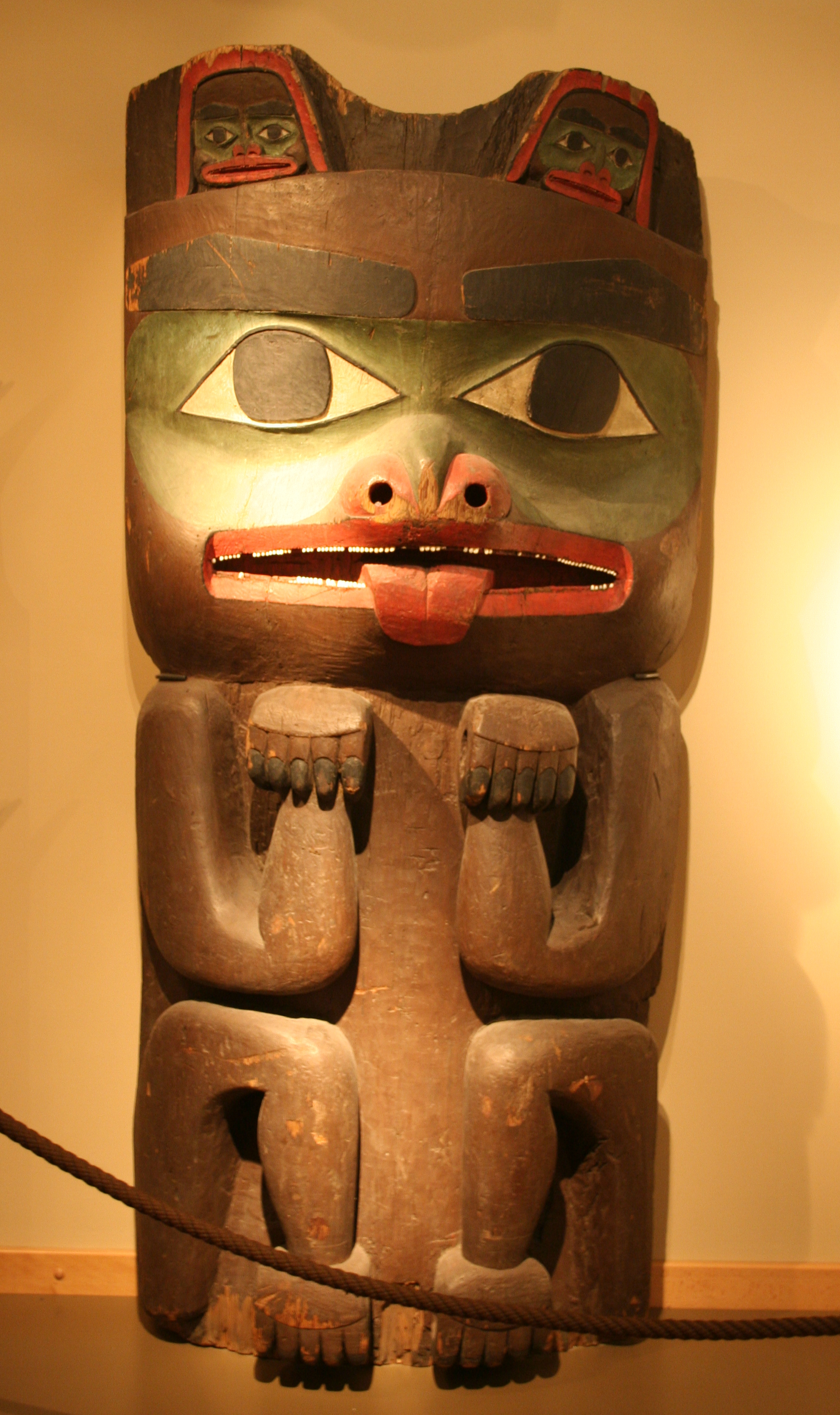
Figure of a bear from the Pacific Northwest Coast

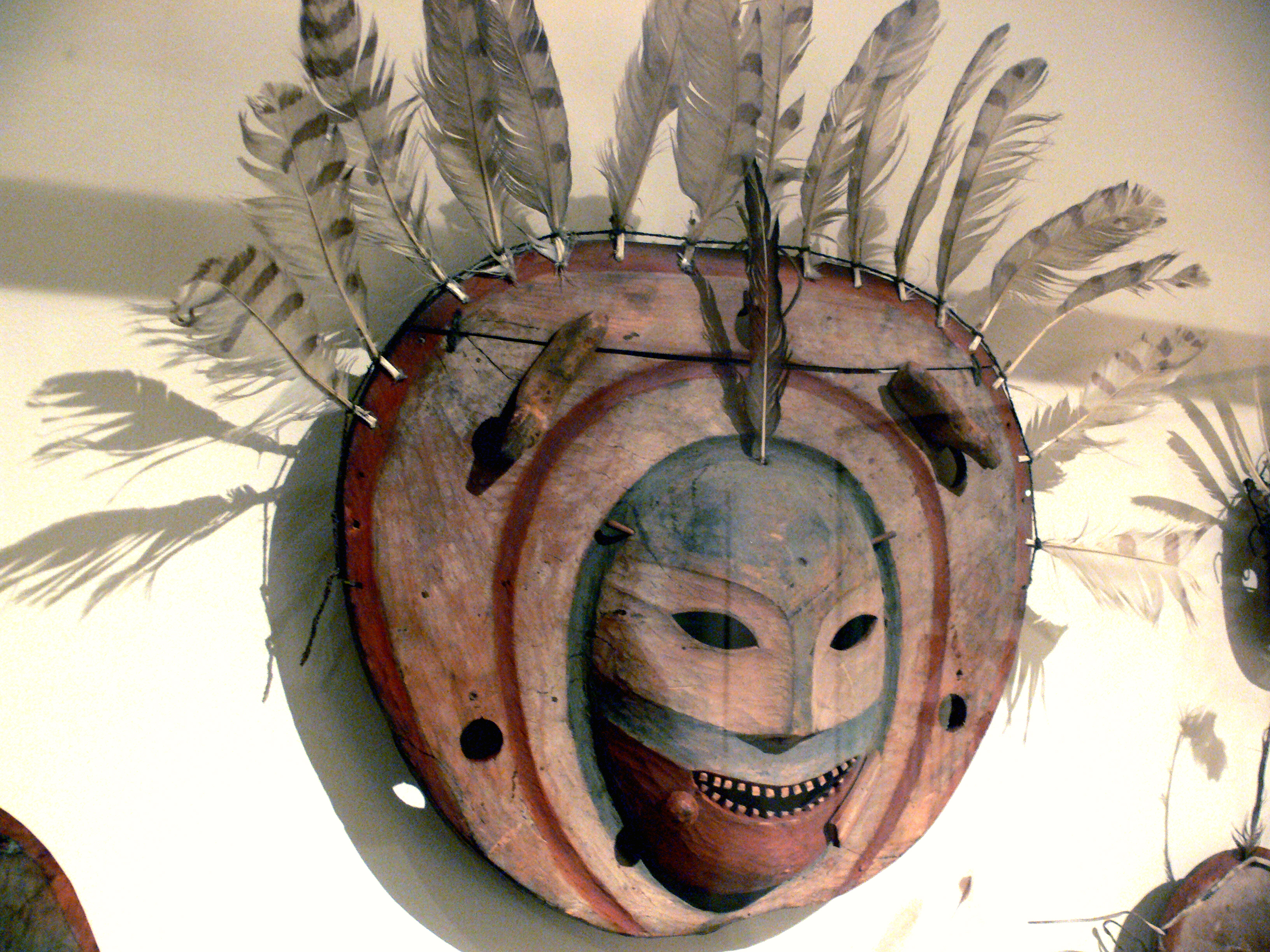
Yupik mask

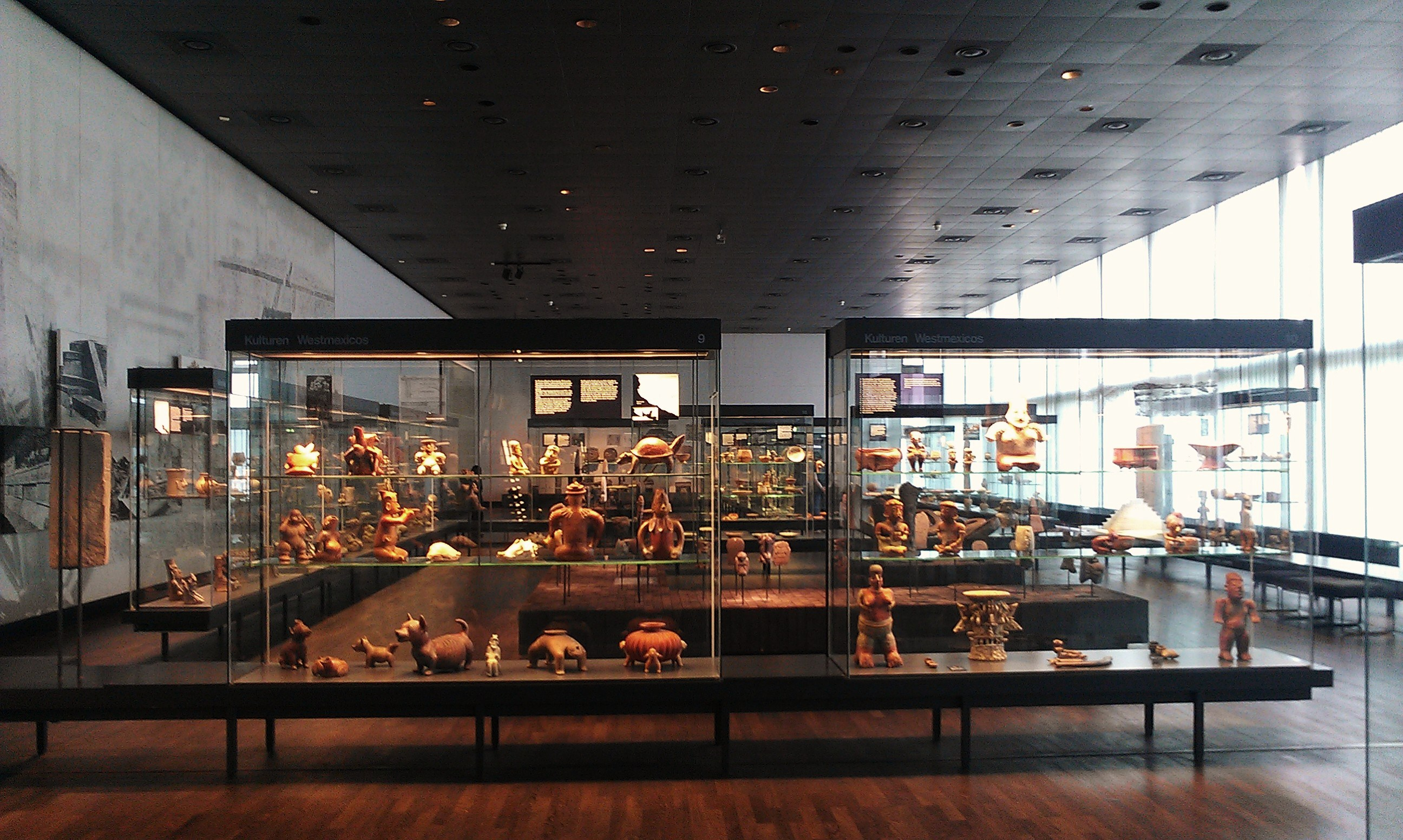
Exhibit featuring artefacts from Mesoamerica

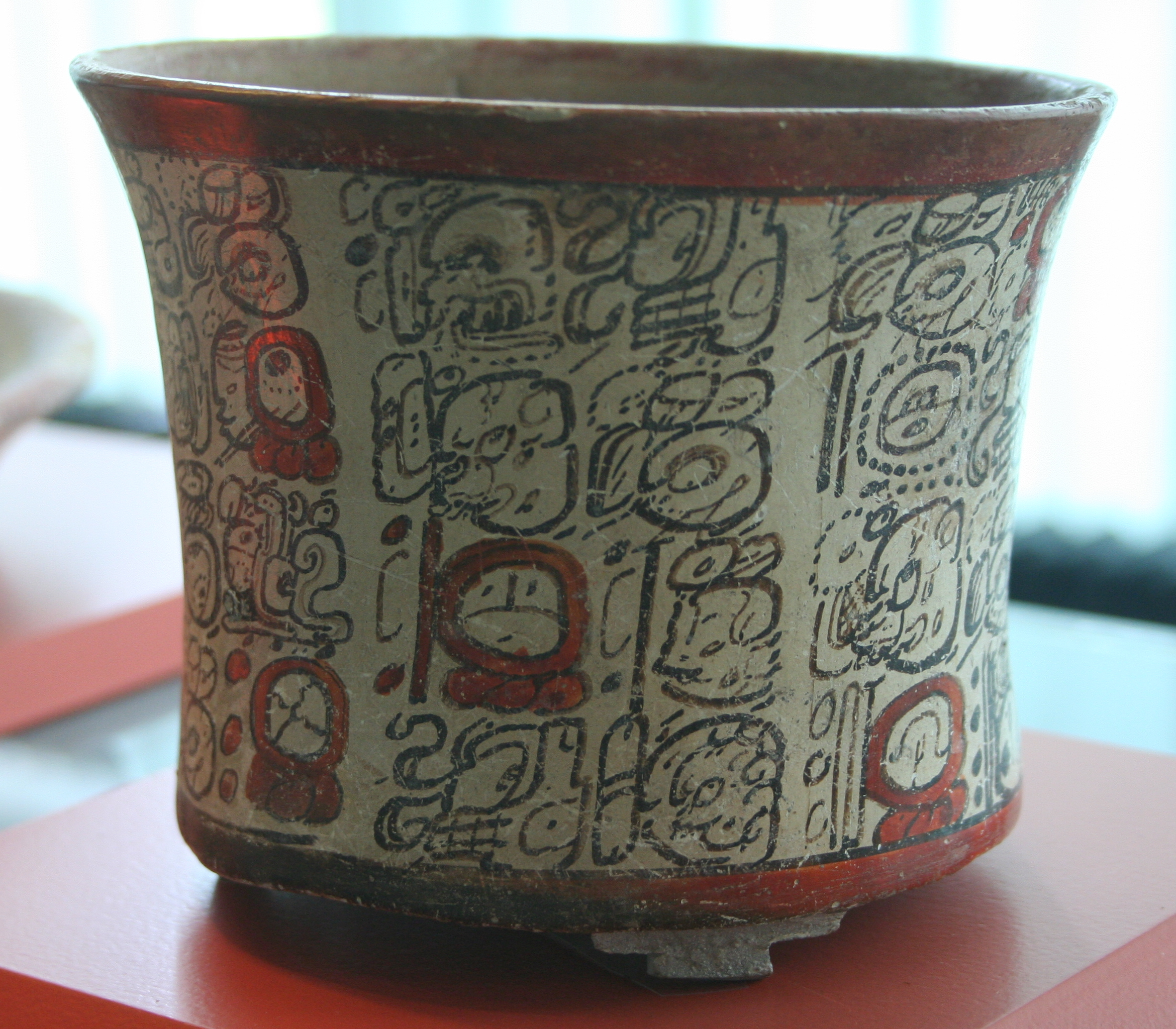
Maya vase with writing

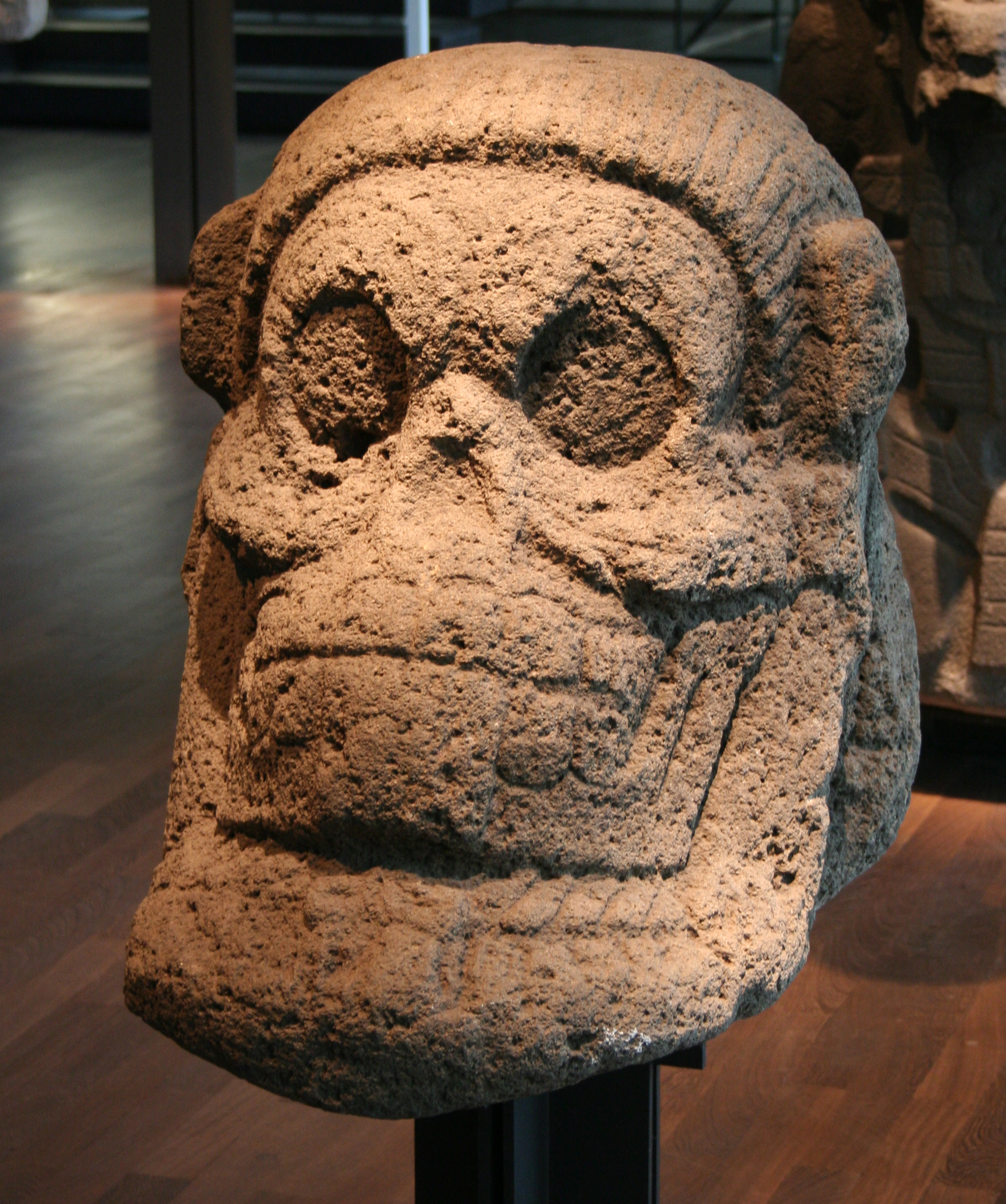
Monumental stone carving of a skull from Mesoamerica

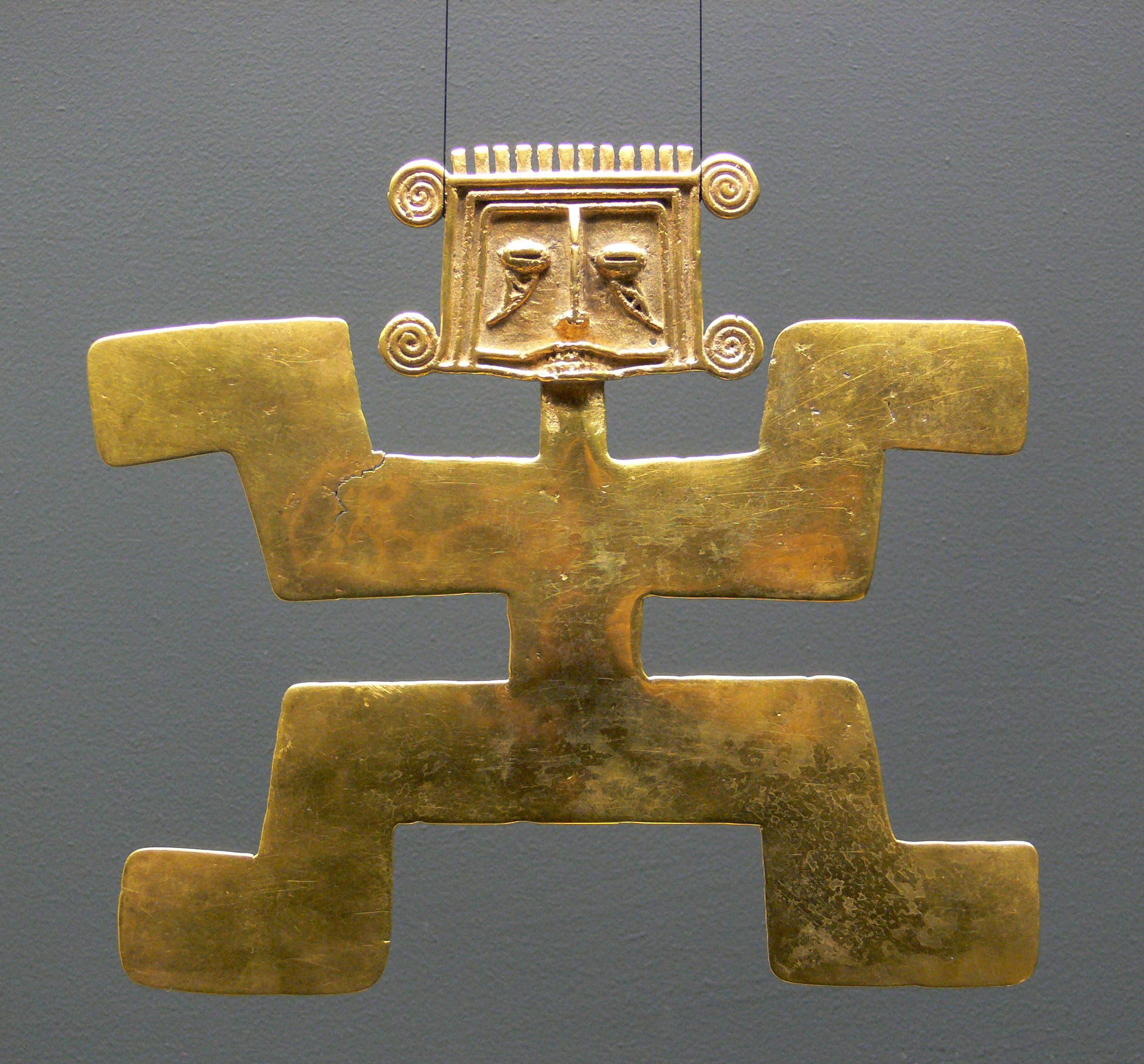
Gold Tolima ornament

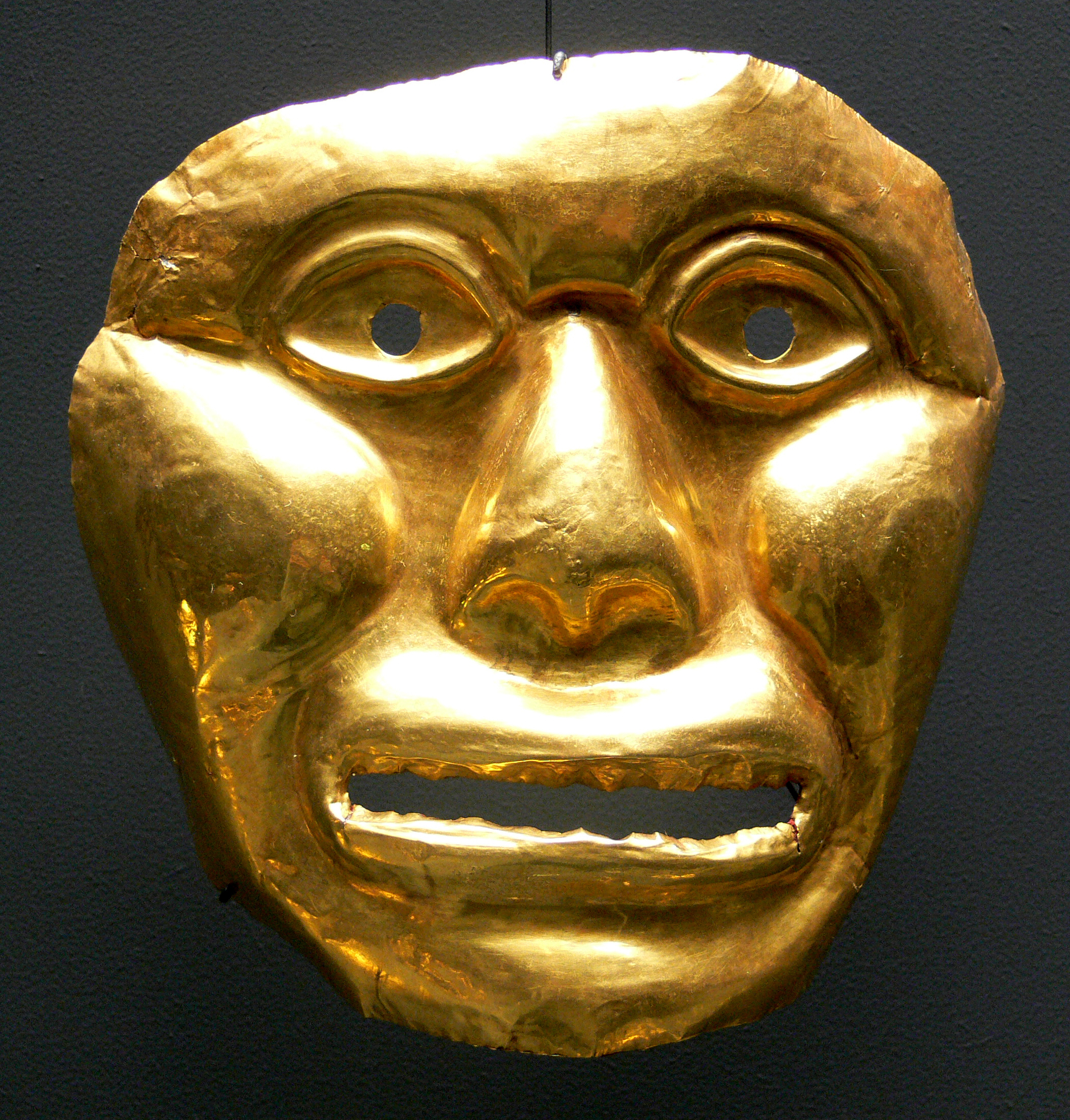
Pre-Columbian death mask

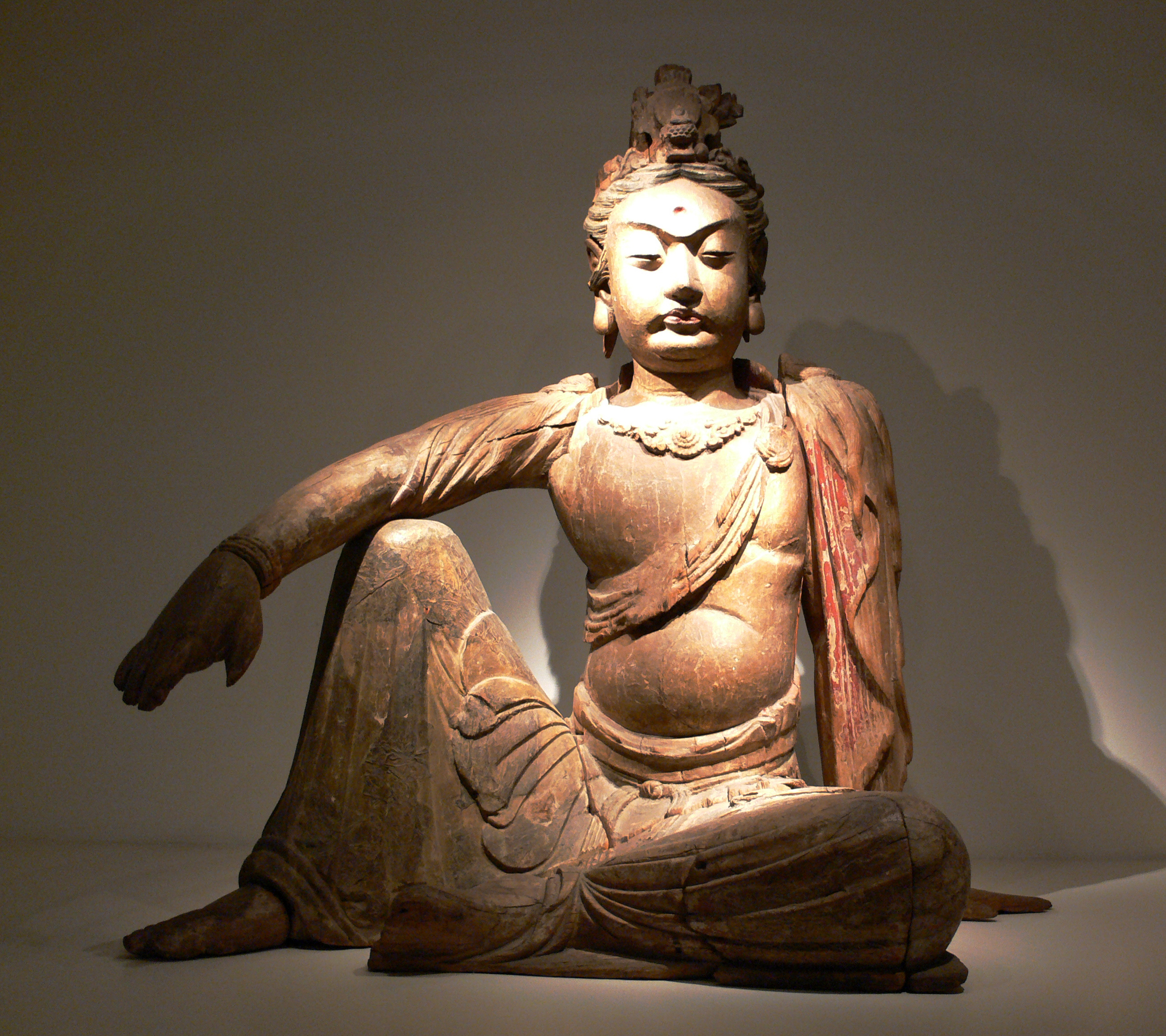
A Chinese wooden sculpture depicting Guanyin, Song Dynasty, 12th century AD

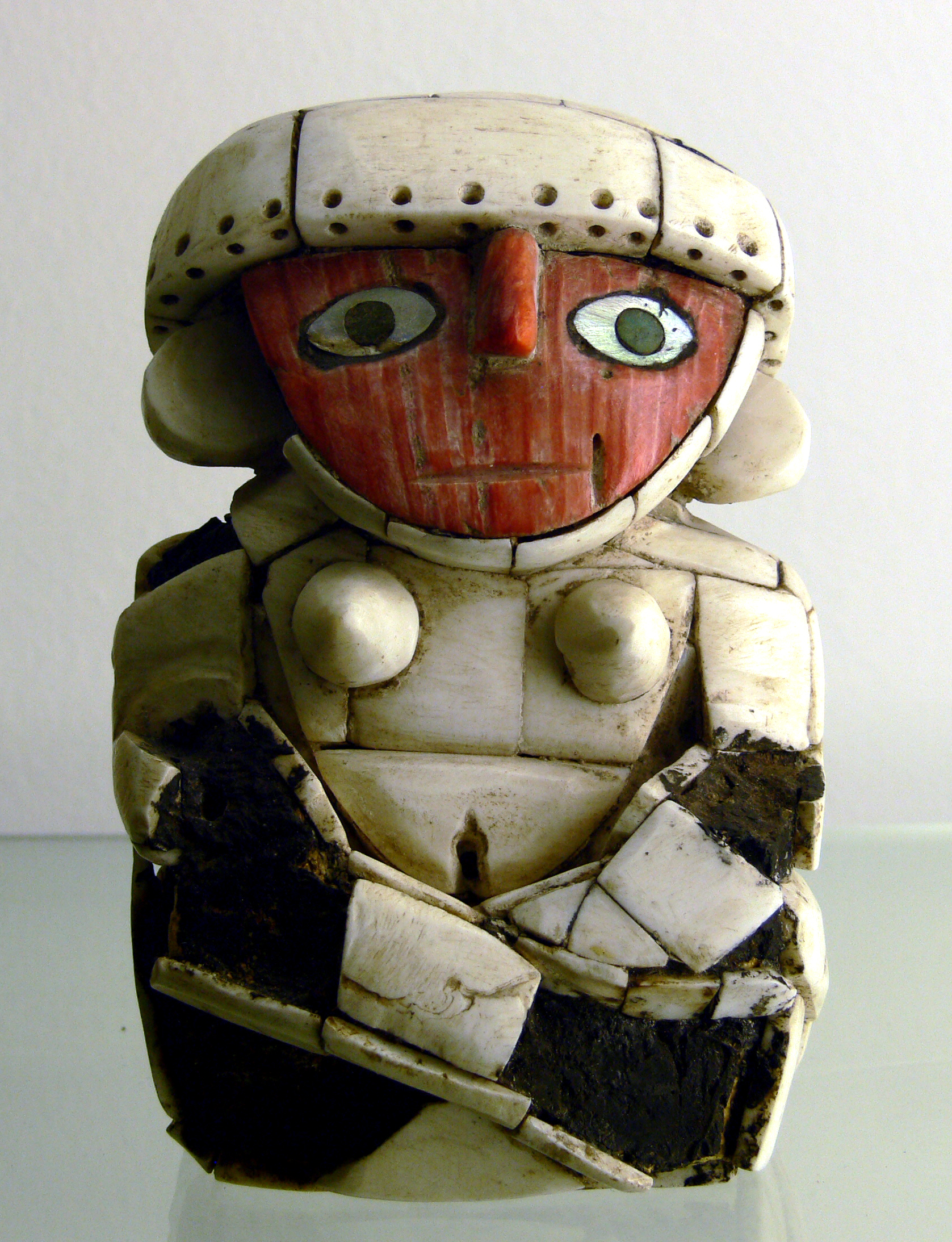
Inca figurine

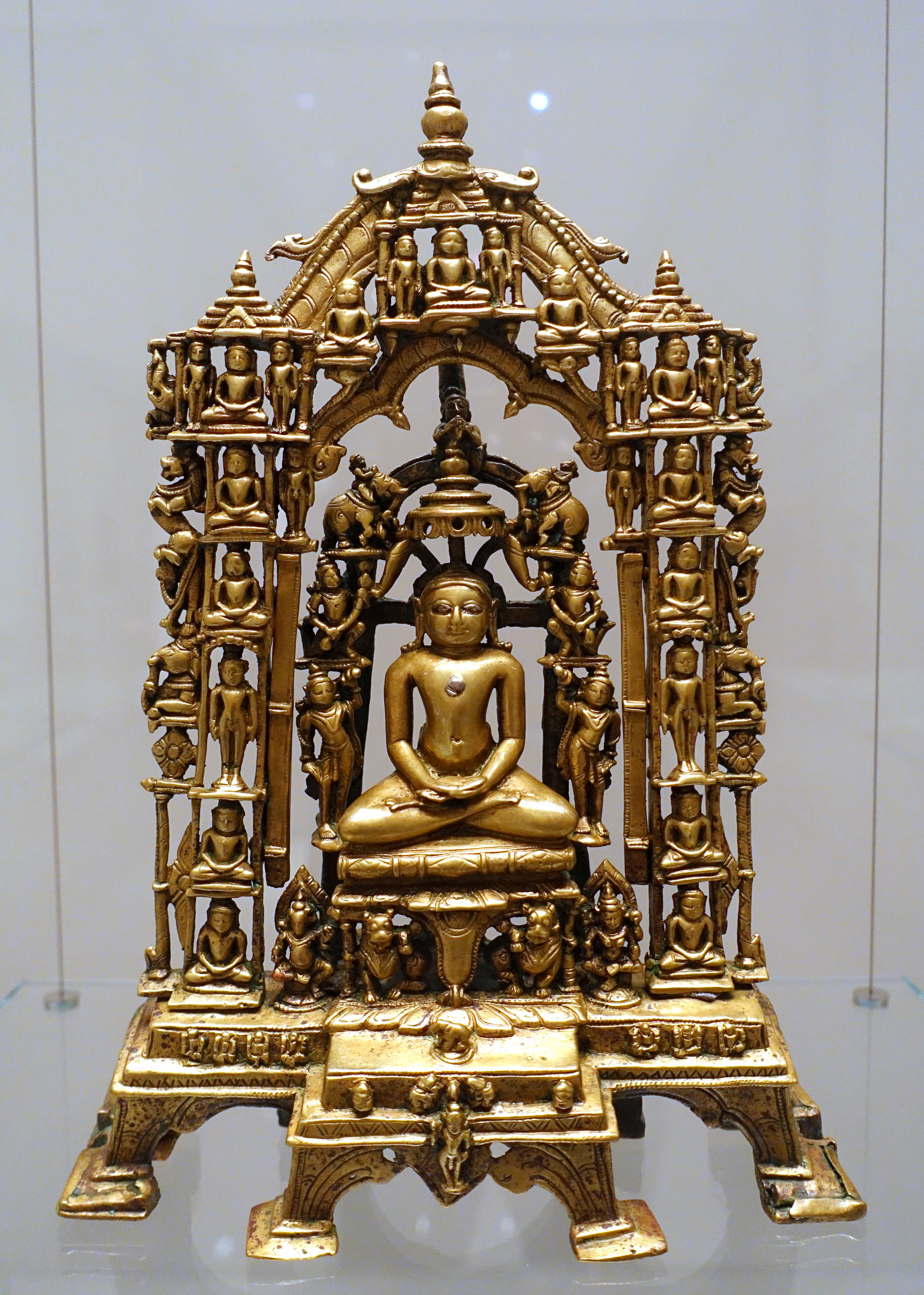
Rishabhanatha with 23 additional Jinas, India, 12th century

== Architecture ==
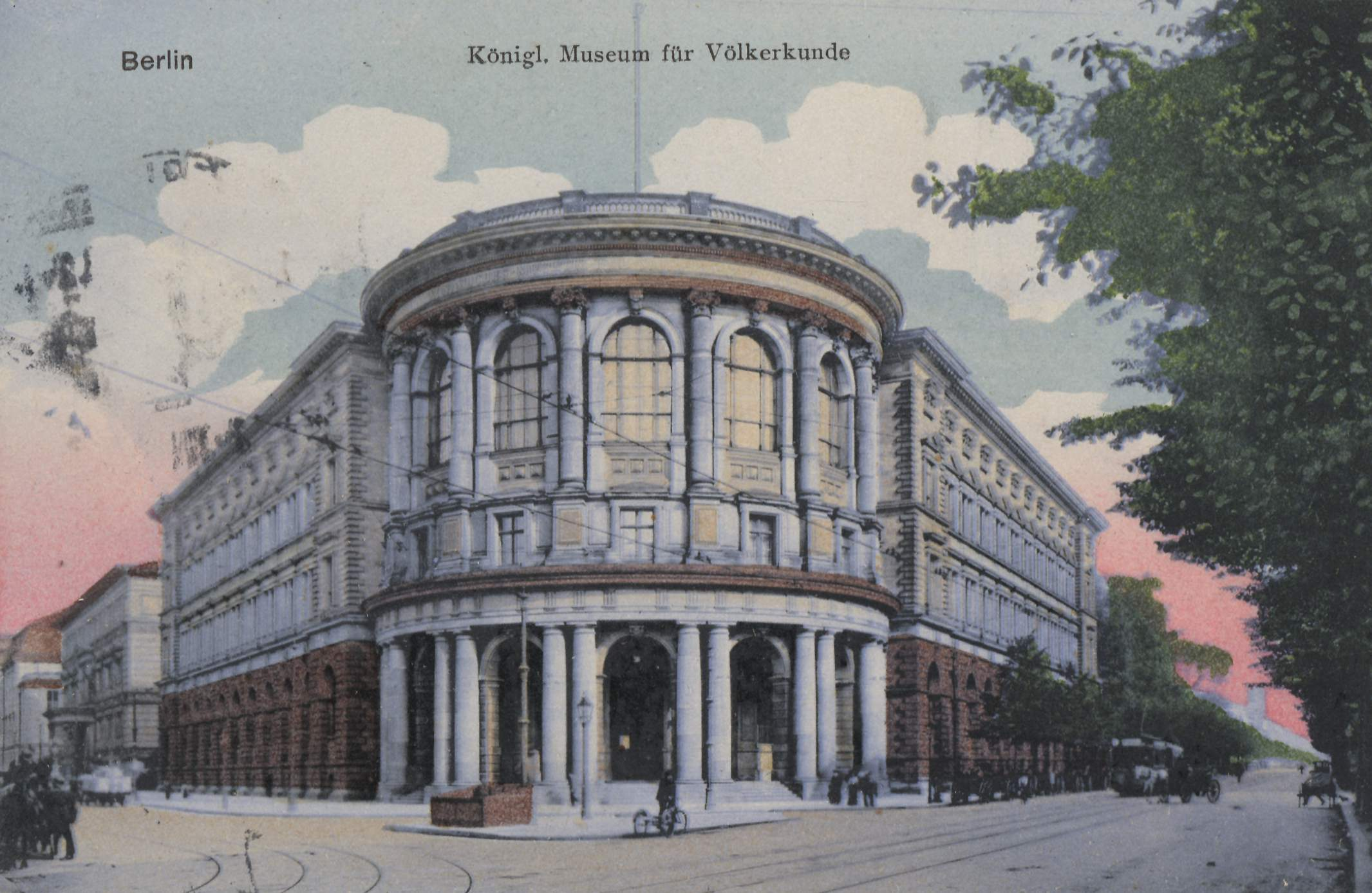
First museum building on Prinz-Albrecht-Straße (l.) and Königgrätzer Straße (r.)

The museum's first building in the center of Berlin on Königgrätzer Straße (now Stresemannstraße at the corner with Niederkirchnerstraße) was already too small to accommodate the collections when it opened in 1886. The situation deteriorated further in the last years of the 19th century, as the collections expanded rapidly because of increased institutional support for ethnology and the growth of the German overseas colonial empire after the Berlin Conference.

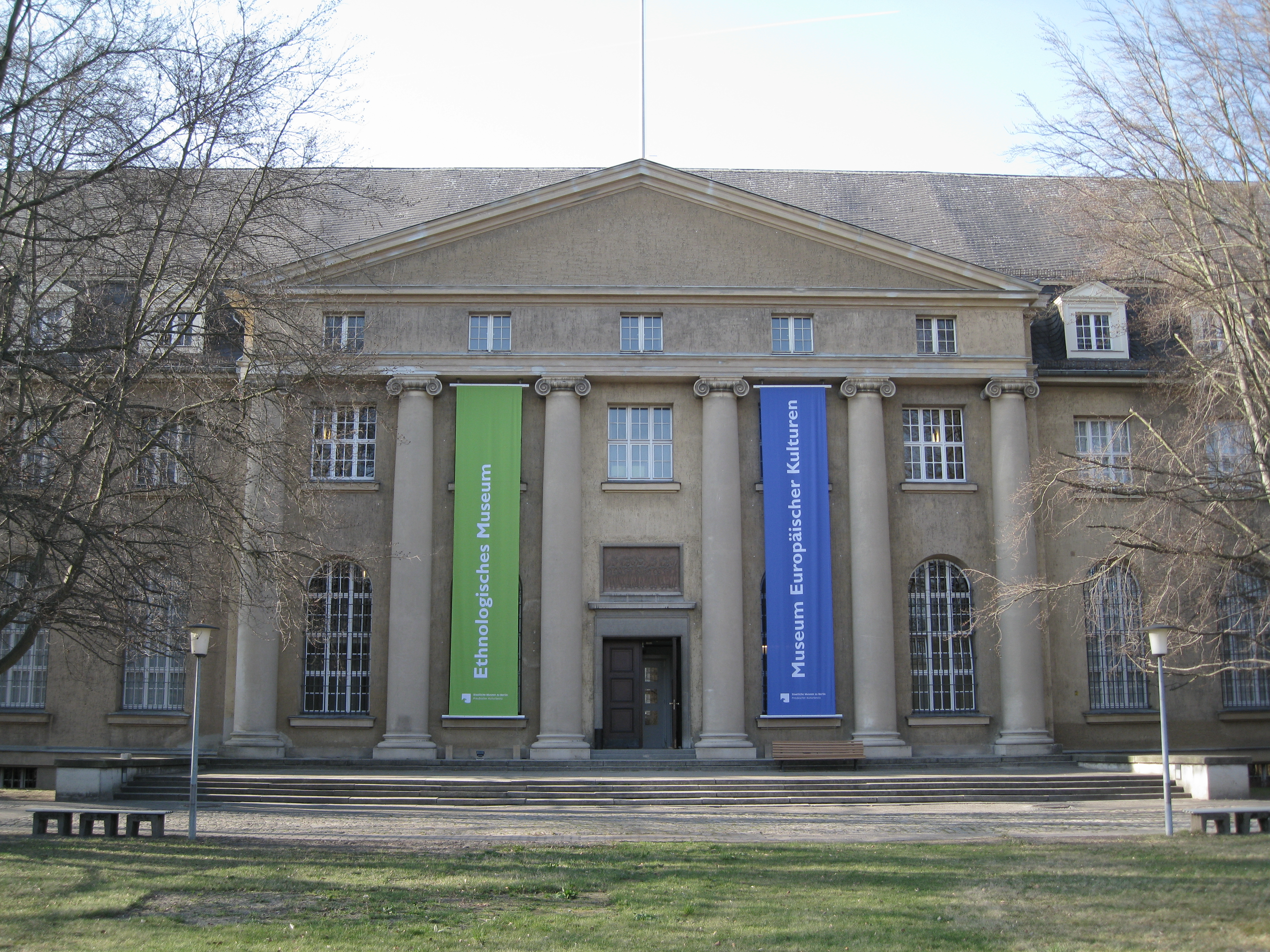
Entrance of the Bruno Paul building on Arnimallee

By 1906, the first construction began on a second facility for the museum in Dahlem. The museum intended to use space in Dahlem to store and conduct research on the large collections, but to continue to exhibit portions of the collection in the building in the city center. Plans were developed for a large complex in Dahlem, consisting of four large buildings, one for each of the non-European geographical regions of the globe: Asia, Africa, Oceania, and the Americas, the latter department directed by Konrad Theodor Preuss. Construction began in 1914, the architect Bruno Paul was commissioned to build the structure to house the Asian collections on Arnimallee, Dahlem. The work was stopped, however, because of the First World War and was only completed in 1921. However, the museum lacked the resources to erect the other three planned buildings. The museum continued to function with two separate facilities housing its collections until the Second World War.

Following the Second World War, as a result of the division of Berlin, the Prussian Cultural Heritage Foundation decided to house the portions of the Gemäldegalerie (Picture Gallery) that were returned to West Berlin in the Bruno Paul building. This decision required moving the collections of the Ethnologisches Museum to a new facility. The architect Fritz Bornemann developed plans for an extension to the Bruno Paul building, which was erected from 1966 to 1970. The Bornemann building faced onto Lansstraße with an uncompromisingly modernist pavilion and contrasted sharply with the older neo-classical Bruno Paul structure, with its main entrance on Arnimallee.

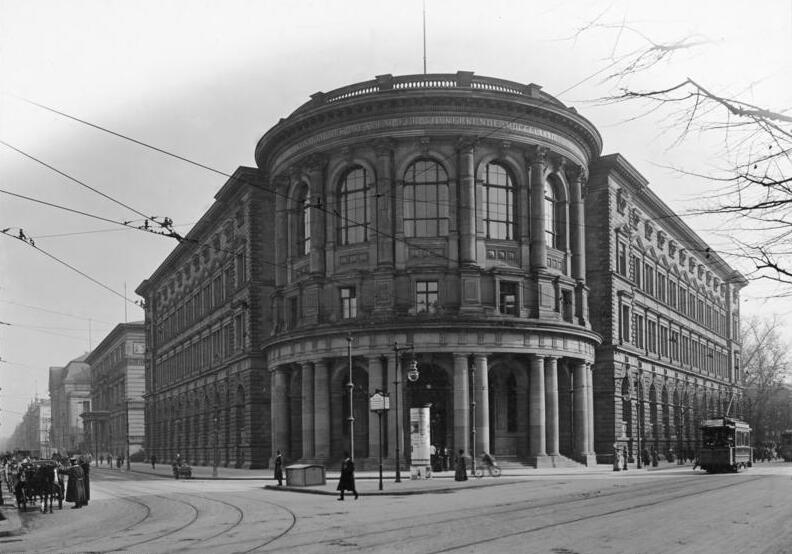
Royal Museum for Ethnology

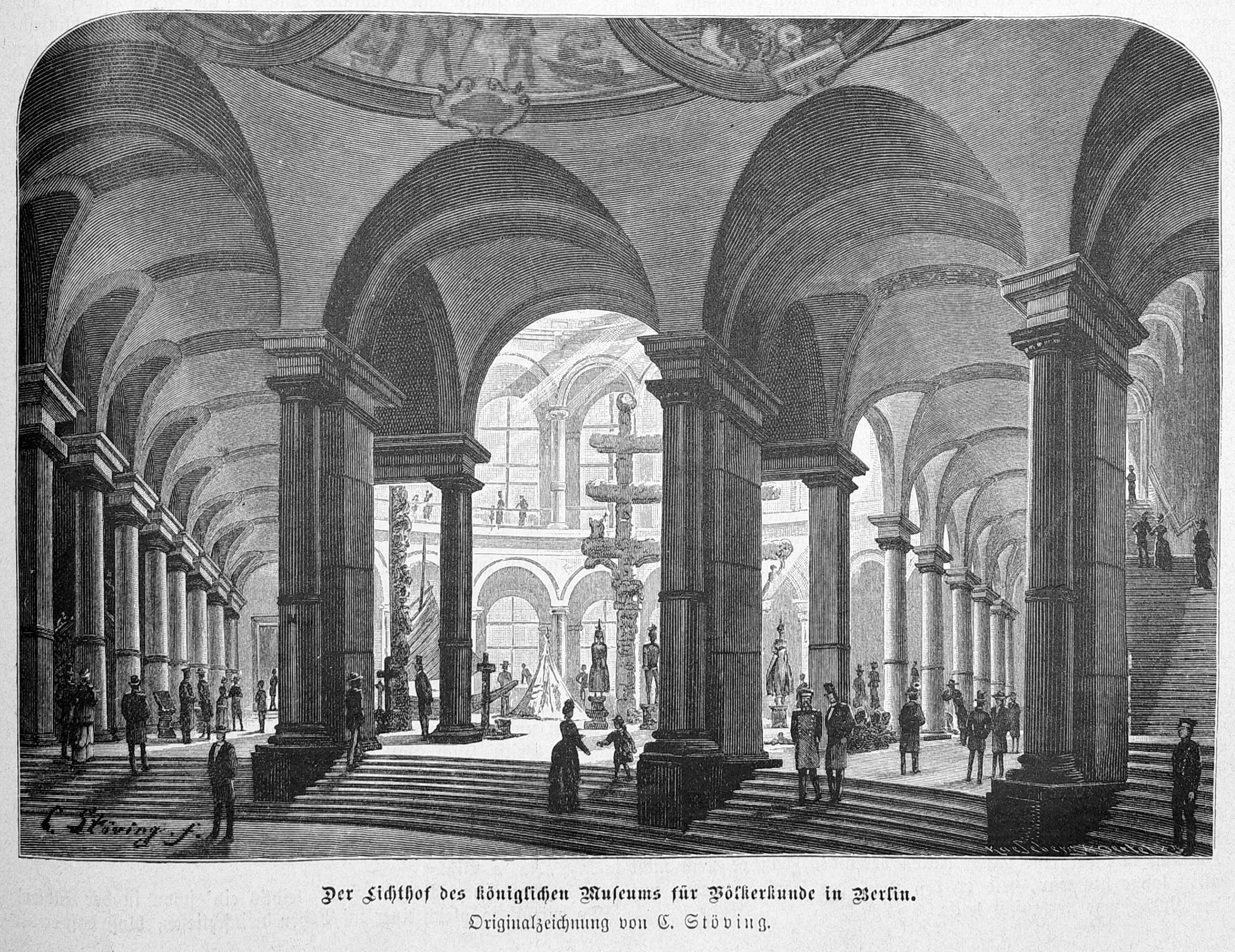
Covered courtyard of the Royal Museum for Ethnology

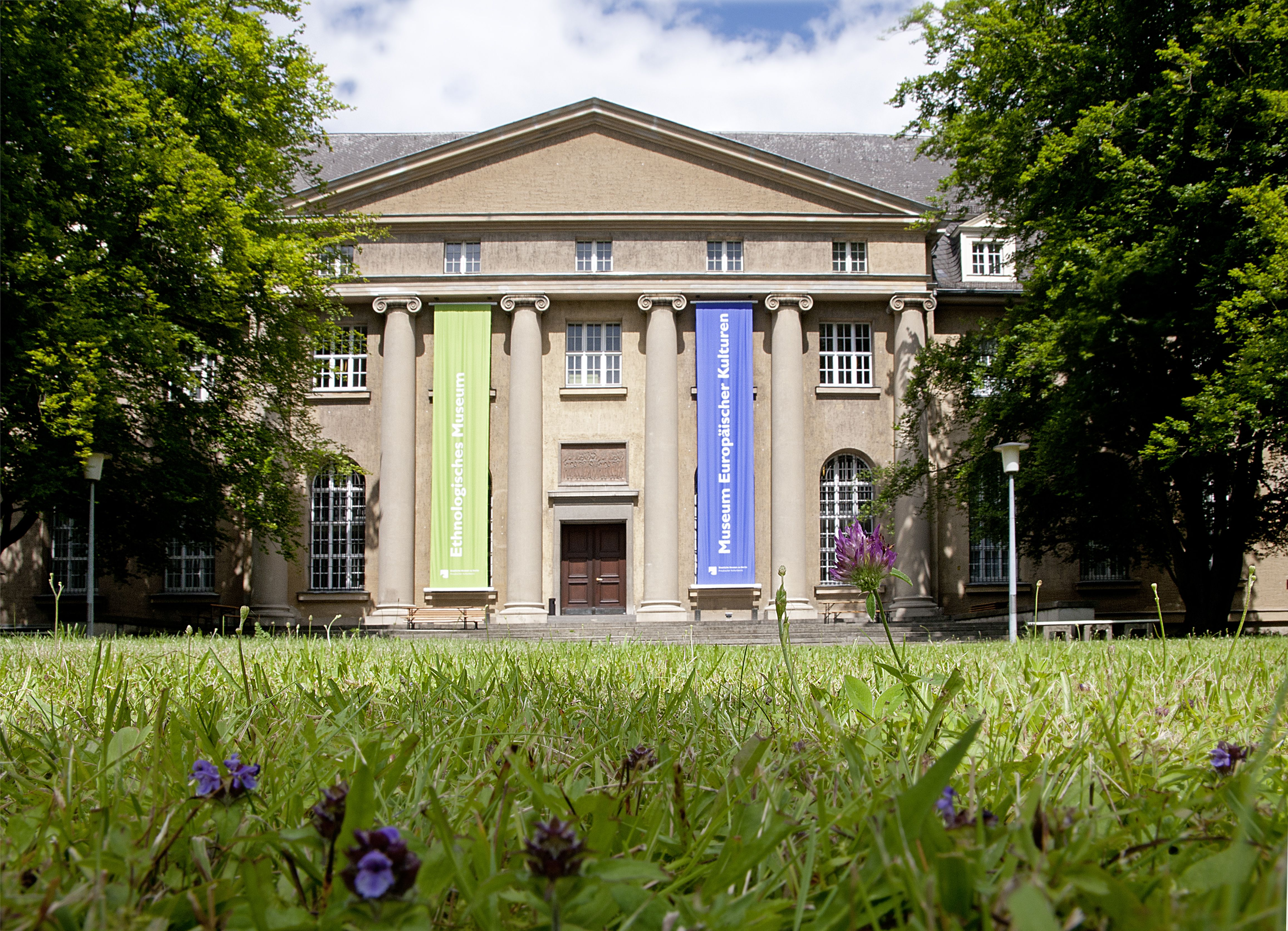
Main entrance of the Bruno Paul building

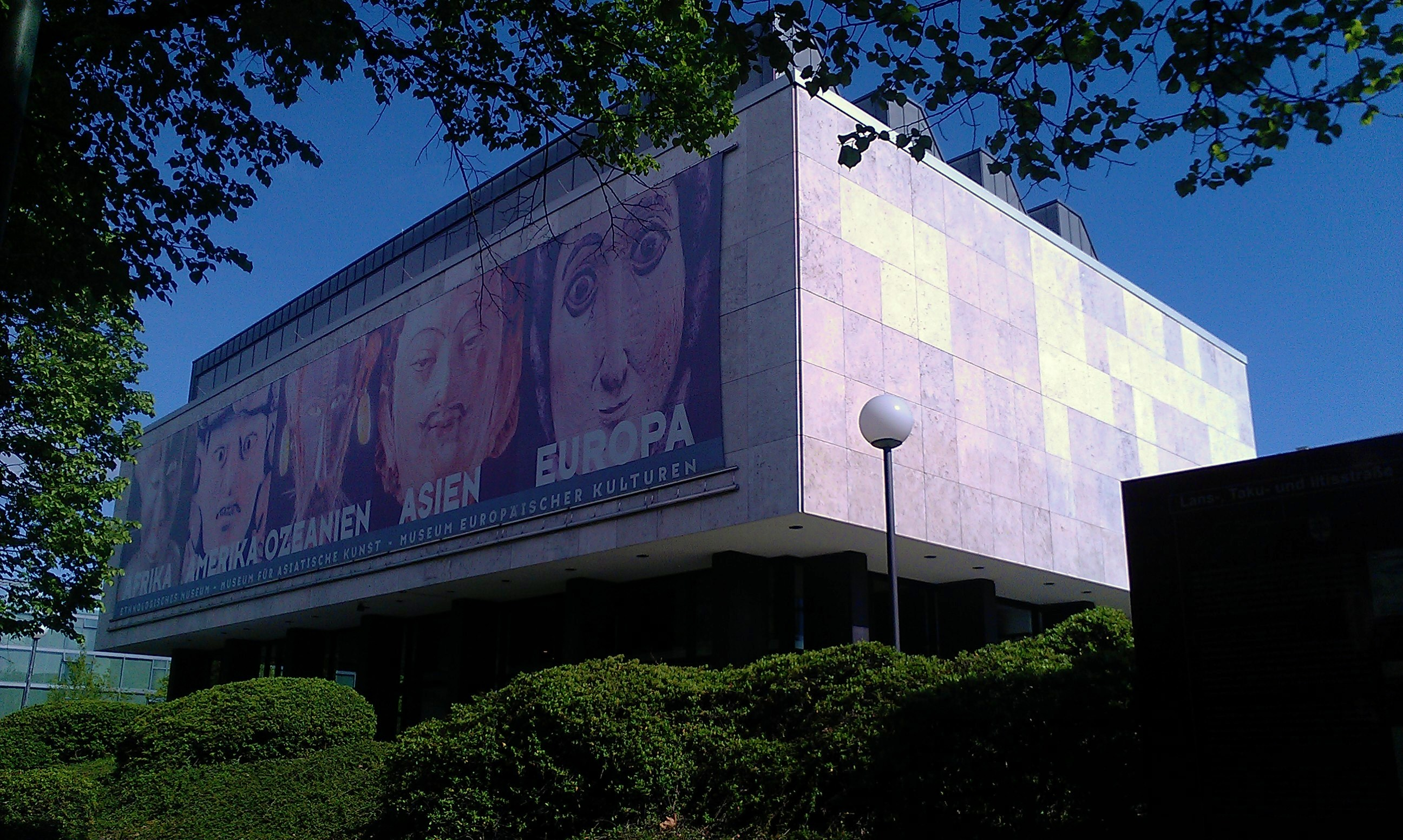
Entrance to the Bornemann building for the former Ethnological Museum in Dahlem

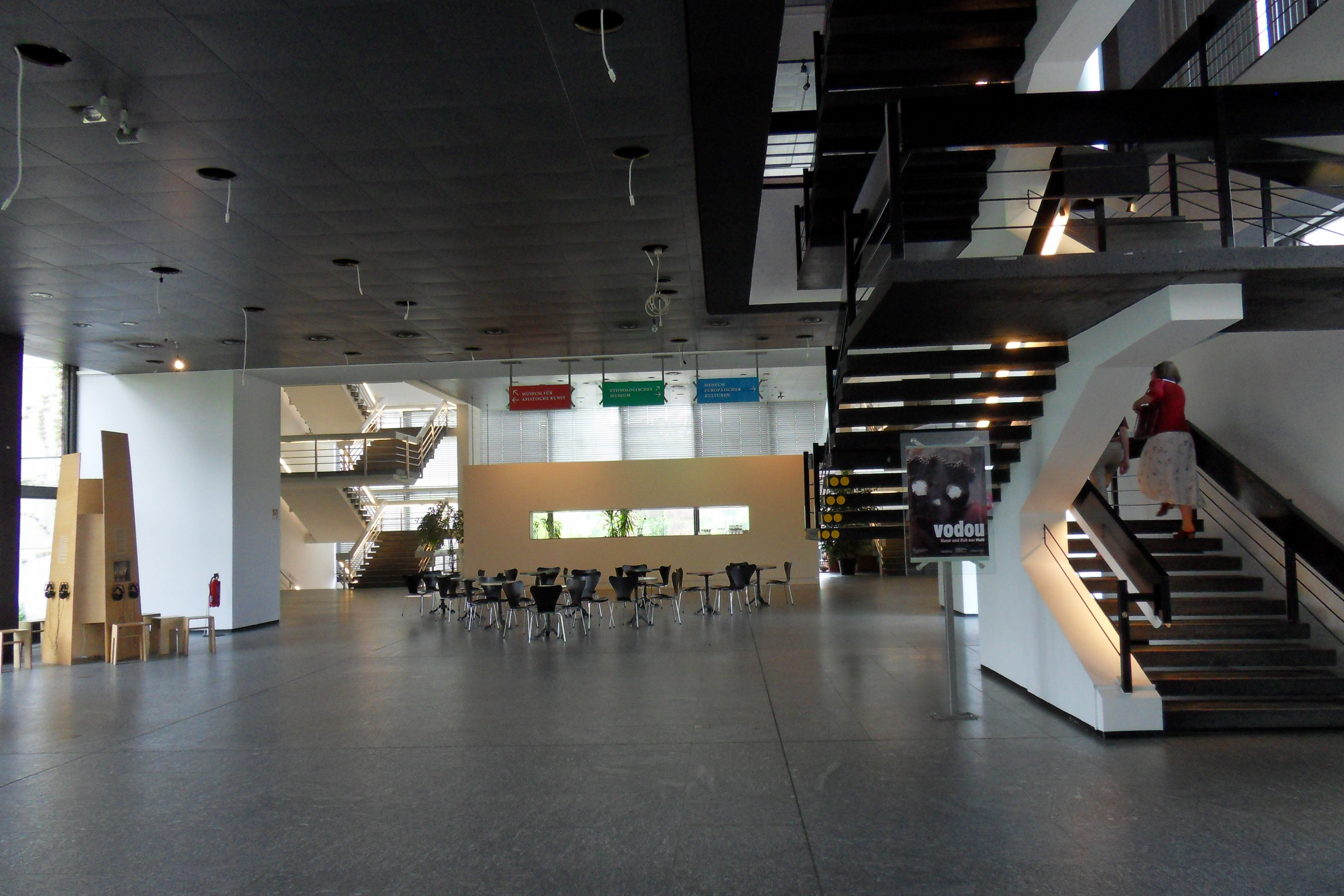
Foyer of the Ethnological Museum

== Directors ==
The following is a verified list of directors of the Ethnologisches Museum in Berlin. Some names do not yet have English Wikipedia entries but are available on Wikidata or in the German Wikipedia.

- Leopold von Ledebur (1829–1873)
- Adolf Bastian (1873–1904)
- Felix von Luschan (1904–1910)
- Albert Grünwedel (1904–1921)
- Eduard Seler (1904–1922)
- F. W. K. Müller (1906–1928)
- Carl Schuchhardt (1908–1925)
- Bernhard Ankermann (1921–1924)
- Konrad Theodor Preuss (1921–1934)
- Albert von Le Coq (1923–1925)
- Walter Lehmann (1927–1934)
- Otto Kümmel (1933–1945)
- Walter Krickeberg (1945–1954)
- Hans-Dietrich Disselhoff (1954–1970)
- Kurt Krieger (1970–1985)
- Klaus Helfrich (1985–2001)
- Viola König (2001–2017)
- Lars-Christian Koch (2017– )
