= Ernst Mengin =

German Mesoamericanist

- Born: June 16, 1893
- Died: January 5, 1973 (aged 79)

Ernst Mengin (16 June 1893 – 5 January 1973) was a German Mesoamericanist. He studied under Walter Lehmann and Konrad Theodor Preuss, who in turn had studied under Eduard Seler. In 1934 Mengin and his family moved from Berlin to Copenhagen, Denmark, and he delivered lectures at the University of Copenhagen, where he established the university's first course in Central American Indian Language and Culture.

== Publications ==
=== As author ===
- Das Recht der französisch-reformierten Kirche in Preußen (1929)

=== As editor ===
- Unos annates histόricos de la natiόn mexicana (1945)
- Memorial de Tecpan-Atitlan (Solola). Anales de los Cakchiqueles Historia del antiguo Reino del Cakchiquel dicho de Guatemala (1952)
