= Seler (disambiguation) =

Eduard Seler (1849–1922) was a German anthropologist.

Seler may also refer to:

- Mount Seler, a mountain between Chile and Argentina
- Caecilie Seler-Sachs (1855–1935), a German ethnologist; married to Eduard
- Lienzo Seler Coixtlahuaca II, a 16th-century indigenous pictorial manuscript from Oaxaca

== See also ==
- Serle, a commune in Italy
- Seller (surname), a surname list
- Sealer (disambiguation)
