= Coixtlahuaca (disambiguation) =

Coixtlahuaca was a pre-Columbian state.

Coixtlahuaca may also refer to:

- Coixtlahuaca District, in the Mixteca Region of the State of Oaxaca, Mexico
- San Juan Bautista Coixtlahuaca, a municipality in Oaxaca, Mexico
