= Isabel Ramírez Castañeda =

Mexican archaeologist and ethnologist (1881–1943)

Isabel Ramírez
- Born: 1881; Milpa Alta, Mexico City, Mexico
- Died: 1943 (aged 61–62)
- Citizenship: Mexican
- Education: Escuela Normal de Profesoras
- Alma mater: Museo Nacional de Antropología
- Occupations: Archaeologist, ethnologist, anthropologist and educator
- Employer: Museo Nacional de Antropología
- Known for: First archaeological excavation led by a woman in Mexico; Nahua folklore research
- Notable work: Contributions to Nahua folklore studies

Isabel Ramírez Castaneda (1881–1943) was a Mexican educator and archaeologist and ethnologist. She was one of the first Mexican women to work as an archaeologist. Affiliated with the National Museum (Museo Nacional de Antropología) for most of her career, she investigated the Nahua folklore of Central Mexico and classified many archaeological collections. Ramírez also carried out the first archaeological excavation led by a woman in Mexico.

== Biography ==
Isabel Ramírez Castañeda was born in 1881 in Milpa Alta, a small town close to Mexico City, Mexico. She originally studied to be a primary and preschool teacher at the Escuela Normal de Profesoras and worked as such for a number of years. She regularly attended Ateneo de la Juventud conferences.

In 1907, Ramírez met anthropologist Eduard Seler and ethnologist Caecilie Seler-Sachs in Mexico. Isabel helped study and classify archaeological artifacts and worked as an assistant during archaeology lectures. In 1906 she won a scholarship to study archaeology, history and ethnology at the National Museum (Museo Nacional de Antropología), which she was affiliated to for much of her career. Isabel also met Franz Boas when he visited Mexico and she became a sort of protégée of his.

With the Selers, Ramírez was introduced to the study of archaeology and she accompanied them in several expeditions to archaeological sites and took up the study of ancient architecture and pottery, as the first female archaeologist in Mexico. She participated in excavations at the Maya site of Palenque in 1911 and carried out the first archaeological excavation led by a woman in Mexico.

In 1912, Ramírez wrote a paper on the cultural practices of Milpa Alta which was published in the Proceedings of the Eighteenth International Congress of Americanists. She was active in the International School of American Archaeology and Ethnology.

Ramírez was a native speaker of the Uto-Aztecan Nahuatl language and contributed a series of folk tales from Milpa Alta to Franz Boas, who published them without acknowledging her as the author in 1924.

Ramírez died in 1943.
