= Toniná =

Pre-Columbian archaeological site

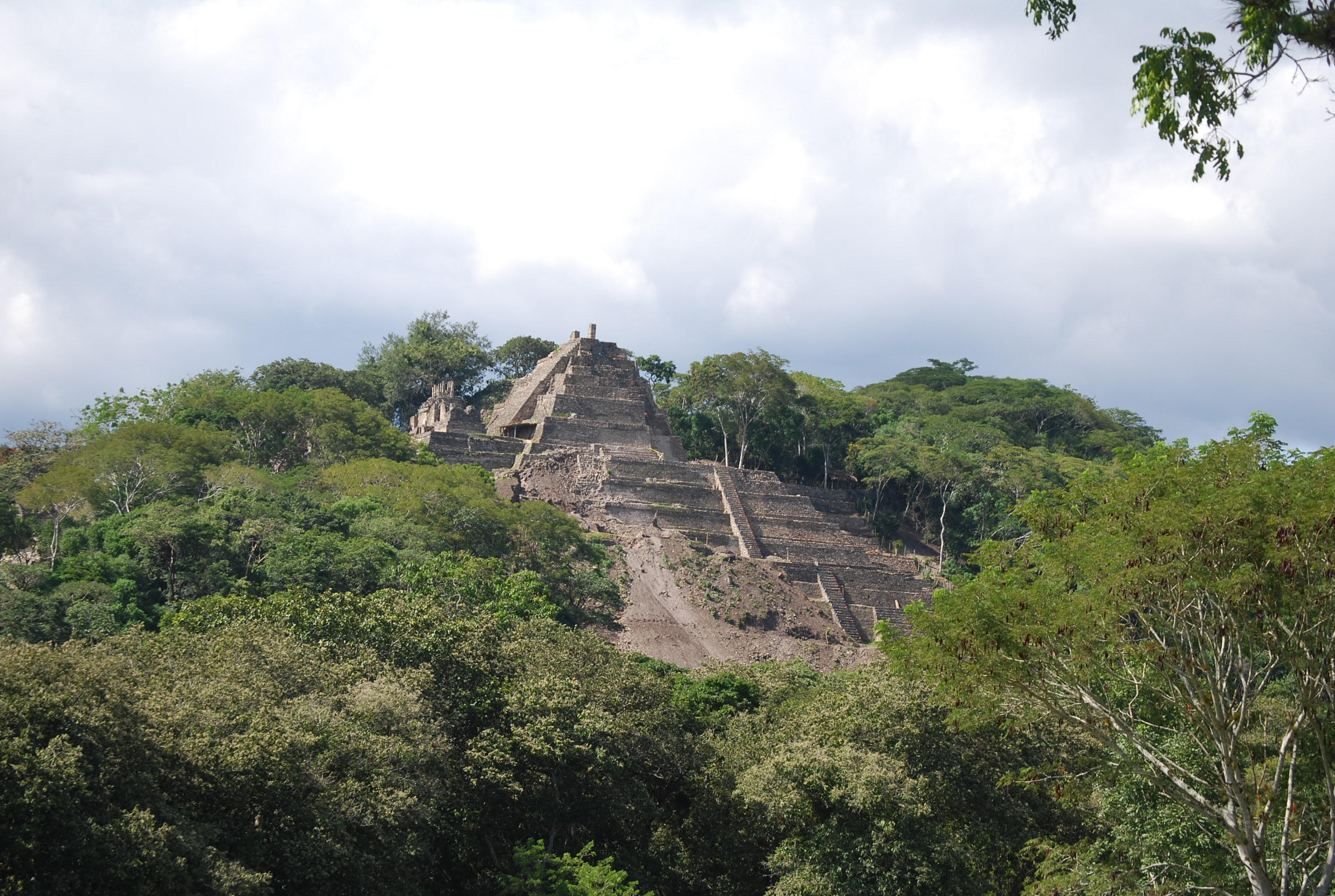
- A pyramid on the 5th terrace of the Acropolis at Toniná.

- Location within Mesoamerica
- 16°54′4.39″N 92°0′34.83″W
- Periods: Classic
- Cultures: Maya
- Location: Ocosingo
- Region: Chiapas, Mexico

History
- Abandoned: 10th century AD

Site notes
- Architectural style: Classic Maya
- Excavation dates: 1972–1975, 1979-1980+
- Archaeologists: Pierre Becquelin, Claude Baudez, Juan Yadeun INAH

Tonina (or Toniná in Spanish orthography) is a pre-Columbian archaeological site and ruined city of the Maya civilization located in what is now the Mexican state of Chiapas, some 13 km (8.1 mi) east of the town of Ocosingo.

The site is medium to large, with groups of temple-pyramids set on terraces rising some 71 metres (233 ft) above a plaza, a large court for playing the Mesoamerican ballgame, and over 100 carved monuments, most dating from the 6th century through the 9th centuries AD, during the Classic period. Toniná is distinguished by its well preserved stucco sculptures and particularly by its in-the-round carved monuments, produced to an extent not seen in Mesoamerica since the end of the much earlier Olmec civilization. Toniná possesses one of the largest pyramids in Mexico; at 74 metres (243 ft) in height, it is taller than the Pyramid of the Sun at Teotihuacan.

Toniná was an aggressive state in the Late Classic, using warfare to develop a powerful kingdom. For much of its history, Toniná was engaged in sporadic warfare with Palenque, its greatest rival and one of the most important polities in the west of the Maya region, although Toniná eventually became the dominant city in the west.

The city is notable for having the last known Long Count date on any Maya monument, marking the end of the Classic Maya period in AD 909.

== Etymology ==
Toniná means house of stone in the Tzeltal language of the local Maya inhabitants, an alternative interpretation is the place where stone sculptures are raised to honour time. However, this is a modern name and the original name was either Po or Popo, appearing in Classic Maya texts in the title used for the kings of Toniná, k'uhul po' ajaw (Divine Lord of Po). A Maya rebellion in Colonial times, in 1558, featured a group called the po' winikob' (People of Po). Early versions of the Toniná emblem glyph bore a doubled po glyph and the term Popo is also found in Colonial records. Since double sounds were often abbreviated in hieroglyphic texts, Popo may represent the original name of the city.

== Location ==
Toniná is located at an altitude of 800 to 900 metres (2,600 to 3,000 ft) above mean sea level in the Chiapas Highlands of southern Mexico, some 40 miles (64 km) south of the contemporary Maya city of Palenque, Toniná's greatest rival throughout its recorded history. Toniná is separated from Palenque by mountainous terrain and the site core is located along an easily defended ascending limestone ridge immediately to the west of a seasonal tributary of the Río Jataté, one of the two rivers forming the Ocosingo Valley.

== Rulers ==
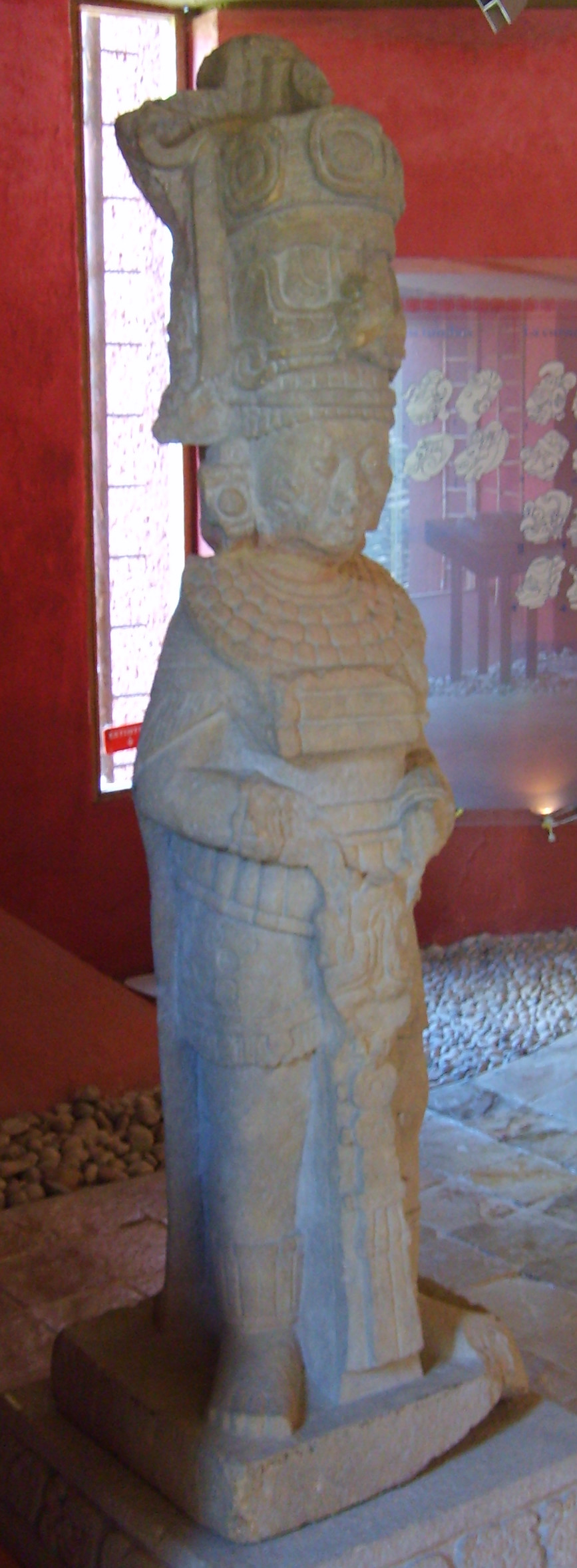
In-the-round sculpture of a ruler in the Toniná site museum

Rulers of Toniná recorded in the Maya script on Toniná monuments include:

Name (or nickname)	Ruled	Alternative names
Unknown name	c. 217	
Kokaaj(?) Witz'	c. 501-514?	Cabeza de Reptil ("Reptile's Head")
K'inich(?) Sawan B'alam Yaxuun Acal/Tihl	January 16, 568-573	B'alam Ya Acal, Jaguar Bird Peccary; Zots Choj
Chac B'olon Chaak	589?	–
K'inich Hix Chapat	c. 595–665	Personage 2
Yuhkno’m(?) Wahywal(?)	July 23, 668–687	Jaguar Casper; Ruler 2
K'inich B'aaknal Chaak	June 17, 688–708/715?	Ruler 3; Personage 3; Kuk; Craneo de Serpiente ("Snake Skull")
K'elen Hix and Ix K'awiil Chan (regents)	November 28, 708 (de facto) - 715/722	K'el Ne Hix and Ix K'awiil Kaan.
K'inich Chuwaaj(?) K'ahk'	November 28, 708 (nominally) - 723	Ruler 4; Dios Jaguar ("Jaguar God")
K'inich Yich'aak Chapat	723–739+	Ruler 5; Garra de Jaguar ("Jaguar Claw")
K'inich Tuun Chapat	ca. 739 - February 15, 762	Ruler 6
Lady K'awiil Yopaat	February 15, 762 - 774	Ruler 7
K'inich ¿? Chapaht	c. 787–806/810?	Ruler 8
Uh Chapat	c. 830-837	Centipede Moon; Ruler 9
Ruler 10	c. 901, 904-909?	–

The last known recorded date at the site is featured on Monument 101 as 15 January 909 CE.

== History ==
=== Early Classic ===
Toniná had a particularly active Early Classic presence, although the Early Classic remains lie entirely buried under later construction. Due to this, early texts are scarce and only offer a glimpse of the early history of the site. An 8th-century text refers to a king ruling in AD 217, although it only mentions his title, not his name.

Ruler 1 is depicted on a couple of Early Classic monuments, the better preserved of which is an altar that dates to 514. A ruler called as K'inich(?) Sawan B'alam Yaxuun Acal/Tihl (known as Jaguar Bird Peccary) is represented on a 6th-century stela, which describes him acceding to the throne in January 16, 568.

The first mention of Toniná in a record from a foreign state is from the site of Chinikiha, located 72 kilometres (45 mi) to the northeast on the Usumacinta River, the text is from a throne and describes the capture of a person from Toniná in 573.

=== Late Classic ===
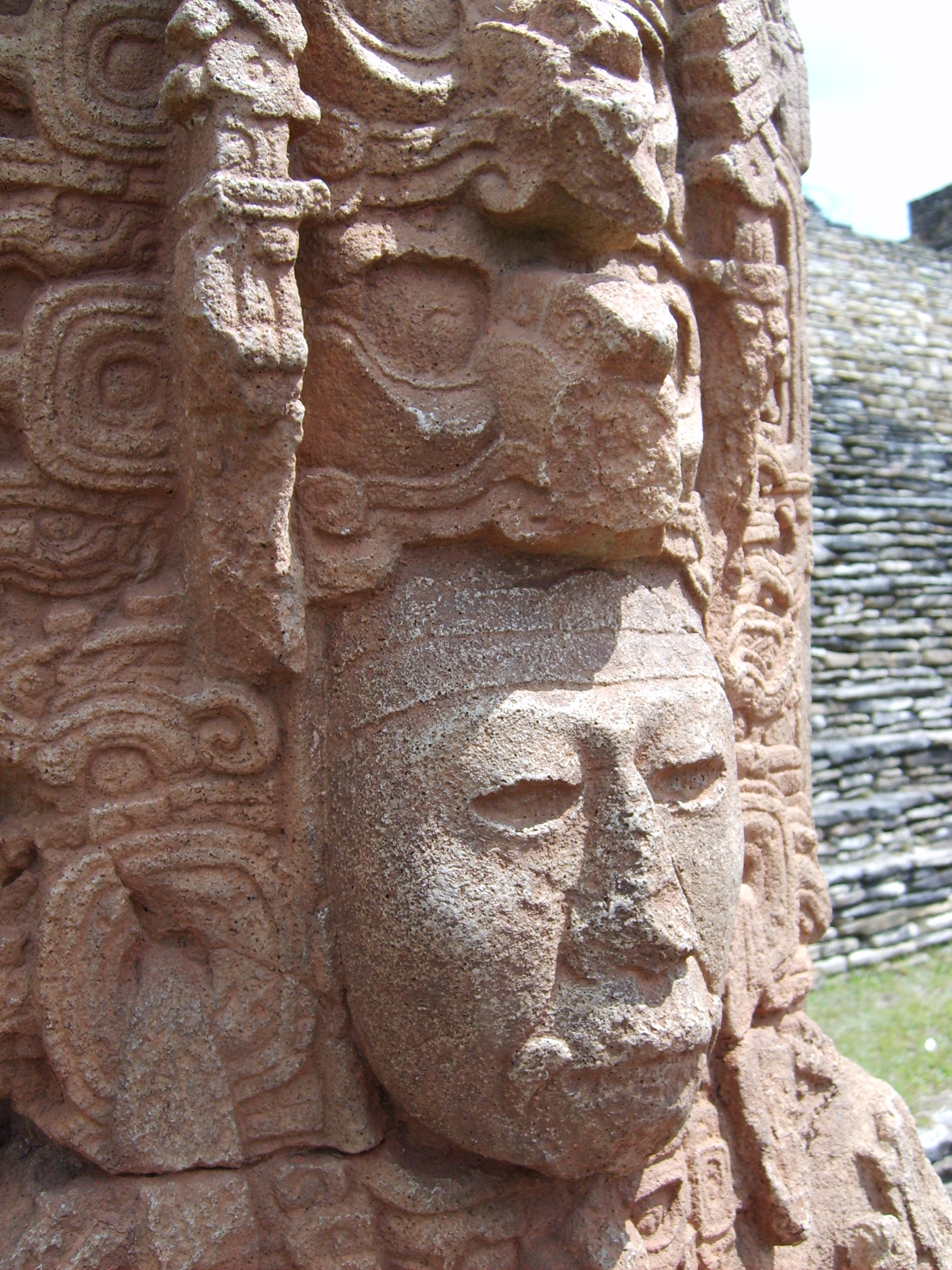
Stela depicting the 6th century ruler K'inich(?) Sawan B'alam Yaxuun Acal/Tihl (formerly known as Jaguar Bird Peccary.

==== K'inich Hix Chapat ====
Toniná's history comes into focus in the Late Classic, when its historical record is more fully represented by hieroglyphic texts. In 633 K'inich Hix Chapat is recorded as installing two subordinate lords but little else is known of his reign, although he was probably enthroned in 595. The last mention of K'inich Hix Chapat is in a monument dated to 665 that appears to be a memorial stone.

==== Yukno'm Wahy: Ruler 2 ====
Ruler 2 acceded to the throne of Toniná in 668. His rule is marked by warfare and the frequent depiction of bound captives on his monuments. Ruler 2 established the use of in-the-round sculptural style that came to typify the stelae of Toniná. A monument dated to 682 depicts three naked prisoners with their arms bound, one of them is identified as a lord from Annak', an as yet unidentified site. His reign may have ended with his defeat and capture by K'inich Kan Balam II of Palenque in September 687, as described in a glyphic text from Temple 17 in the rival city, an event that probably culminated in his sacrifice.

==== K'inich B'aaknal Chaak ====
K'inich B'aaknal Chaak was enthroned in 688, twenty years after Ruler 2, and reigned for twenty-seven years. During his reign he restored Toniná's power with a number of military victories over Palenque, and his reign was dominated by the struggle against the rival city for regional power. Ballcourt 1, the larger of Toniná's two ballcourts, was dedicated in 699 to celebrate three victories over the city's arch-rival. The ballcourt originally had six sculptures of bound captives, all vassals of the enemy Palenque king from the Usumacinta region. The date of the king's death is unknown.

==== K'inich Chuwaaj(?) K'ahk': Ruler 4 ====
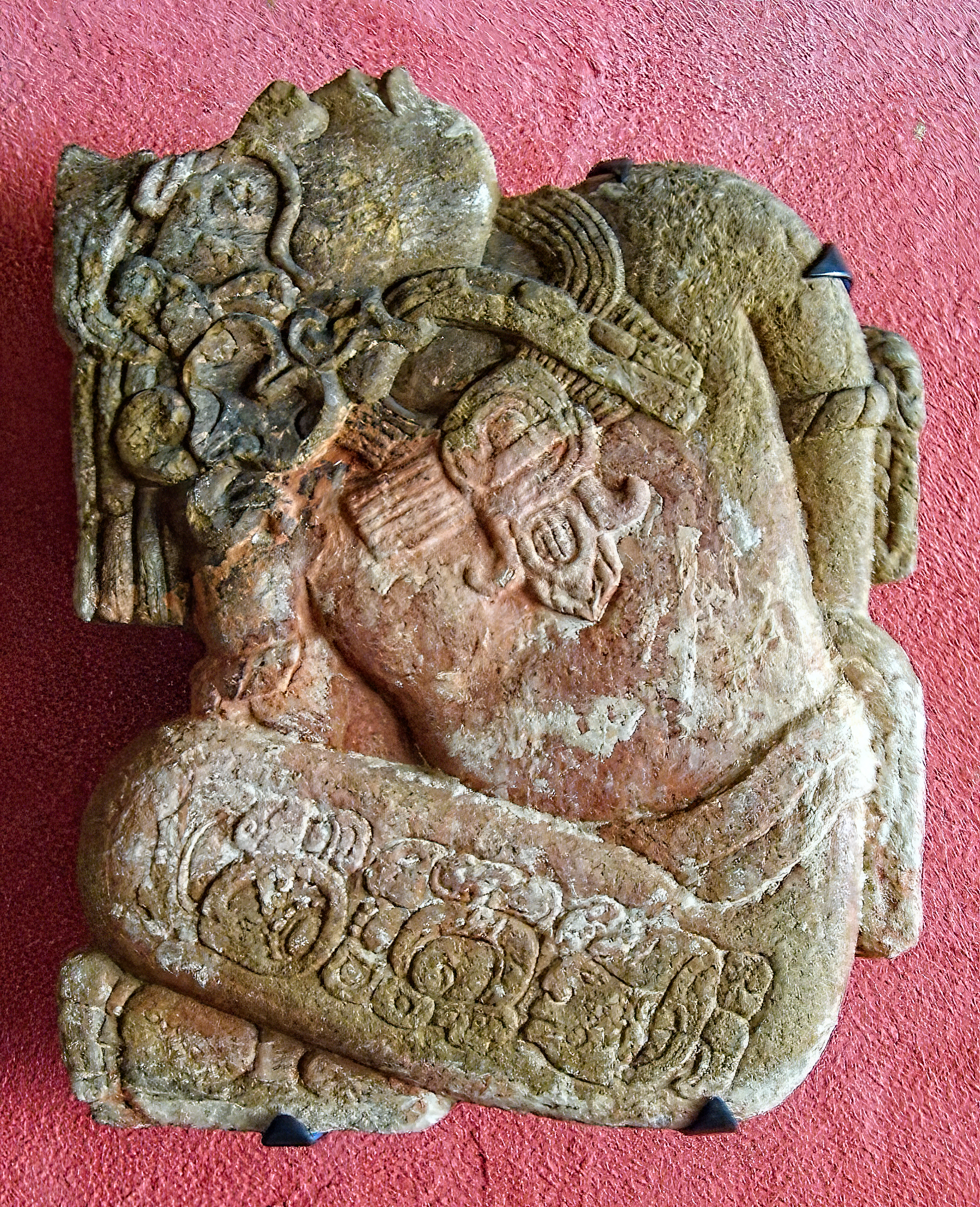
Sculpture of a bound captive in the site museum of Toniná.

Ruler 4 came to power in 708 at a very young age. Three years later, in 711, while Ruler 4 was still a child, Toniná gained an important victory over Palenque. The battle resulted in the capture of Kan Joy Chitam II of Palenque and made Toniná the dominant centre in the lower Usumacinta region. The victory was so complete that it resulted in a ten-year gap in the dynastic history of the defeated city, during which the captured ruler may have been held hostage. Ruler 4 continued in power to celebrate the period endings of 716 and 721. A captive depicted on one of his monuments is identified as being from the distant city of Calakmul, one of the two Maya "superpowers".

==== K'inich Ich'aak Chapat ====
Ruler 4 was succeeded by K'inich Ich'aak Chapat in 723. Around 725 Toniná fought a war against Piedras Negras, a city on the north bank of the Usumacinta River, now in Guatemala. A series of events during his reign were marked on monuments between 726 and 729 and in 730 he rededicated the tomb of his predecessor K'inich B'aaknal Chaak. The mother of K'inich Ich'aak Chapat is named as Lady Winik Timan K'awiil and his father may well have been K'inich B'aaknal Chaak himself. The reign of K'inich Ich'aak Chapat is notable for the absence of the usual sculptures depicting bound war captives, although the reason for this is unknown.

==== Later rulers ====
Little is known of the next two rulers, Ruler 6 is named as K'inich Tuun Chapat, he celebrated the period ending of 736 and may have died 762. A damaged text accompanying the image of a bound captive indicates renewed warfare with Palenque during his reign, however the name of the prisoner is lost and it is unclear if it is the actual king of Palenque or merely one of his vassals.

He was succeeded by Ruler 7, about whom even less is known. Around 764 Toniná defeated Palenque in battle. Ruler 7 has been identified as the mysterious Lady K'awil, known from a fragmentary text on an altar disc which records her death in 774.

In 775 a text recorded the death of Lord Wak Chan K'ak', a prince who appears to have been the heir to the throne and who died before he could take power.

Ruler 8 was the last of the successful warrior kings of Toniná. He celebrated a series of events between 789 and 806, including the defeat of Pomoy in 789, and the capture of the ruler Ucha'an Aj Chih, who appears to have been the vassal of B'olon K'awiil of Calakmul. In 799 he rededicated the tomb of Ruler 1. Ruler 8 oversaw an extensive remodelling of the upper levels of the Acropolis. Ruler 8 erected a number of sculptures of bound prisoners of war and adopted the title aj b'olon b'aak, "He of Many Captives". However, the lesser extent of Toniná's power is evident from its victory over the site of Sak Tz'i' (White Dog), an important city in the Lacandon region, an area which had once been dominated by Toniná.

By the time of Ruler 8's successor, Uh Chapat, Toniná was clearly in decline. Only a single event, in 837, can be dated to his reign, although a stucco mural depicting captives with garrottes at their throats may belong to his period of rule.

The history of Toniná continued after most other Classic Maya cities had fallen, perhaps aided by the site's relative isolation. Ruler 10 is associated with a monument dating to 904 in the Terminal Classic and a monument dating to 909 bears the last known Long Count date although the name of the king has not survived. Ceramic fragments indicate that occupation at the site continued for another century or more.

==== Ritual Cremation of Rulers ====
Urns containing cremated remains of Mayan rulers discovered in the Temple of the Sun at Toniná, were found to also contain rubber, coal, and roots - materials that make up the rubber balls used in the mesoamerican ball game - leading archeologists to believe that the Mayans of this period in Toniná memorialized their rulers by incorporating their ashes into the ritual game of ball typical of mesoamerican cultures.

=== Modern history ===
The first published account of the ruins was made by Fray Jacinto Garrido at the end of the 17th century. A number of visitors investigated the ruins of Toniná in the 19th century, the first being an expedition led by Guillaume Dupaix in 1808. John Lloyd Stephens and Frederick Catherwood visited in 1840, and Stephens wrote an extensive description of the site. Eduard Seler and Caecilie Seler-Sachs investigated the monuments at Toniná, publishing their reports at the turn of the 20th century. Karl Sapper visited the site in 1895 and 1896. Frans Blom and Oliver La Farge investigated the site in 1920s for Tulane University, publishing their reports in 1926–1927.

The French Toniná Project began excavations in 1972 which continued through 1975, then resumed in 1979 to 1980, under the direction of Pierre Becquelin and Claude Baudez. The National Institute of Anthropology and History of Mexico (INAH, the Instituto Nacional de Antropologia e Historia) began their own excavations at Toniná the following year.

The site is accessible for tourism and has a small museum that was inaugurated on 15 July 2000.

== Site description ==
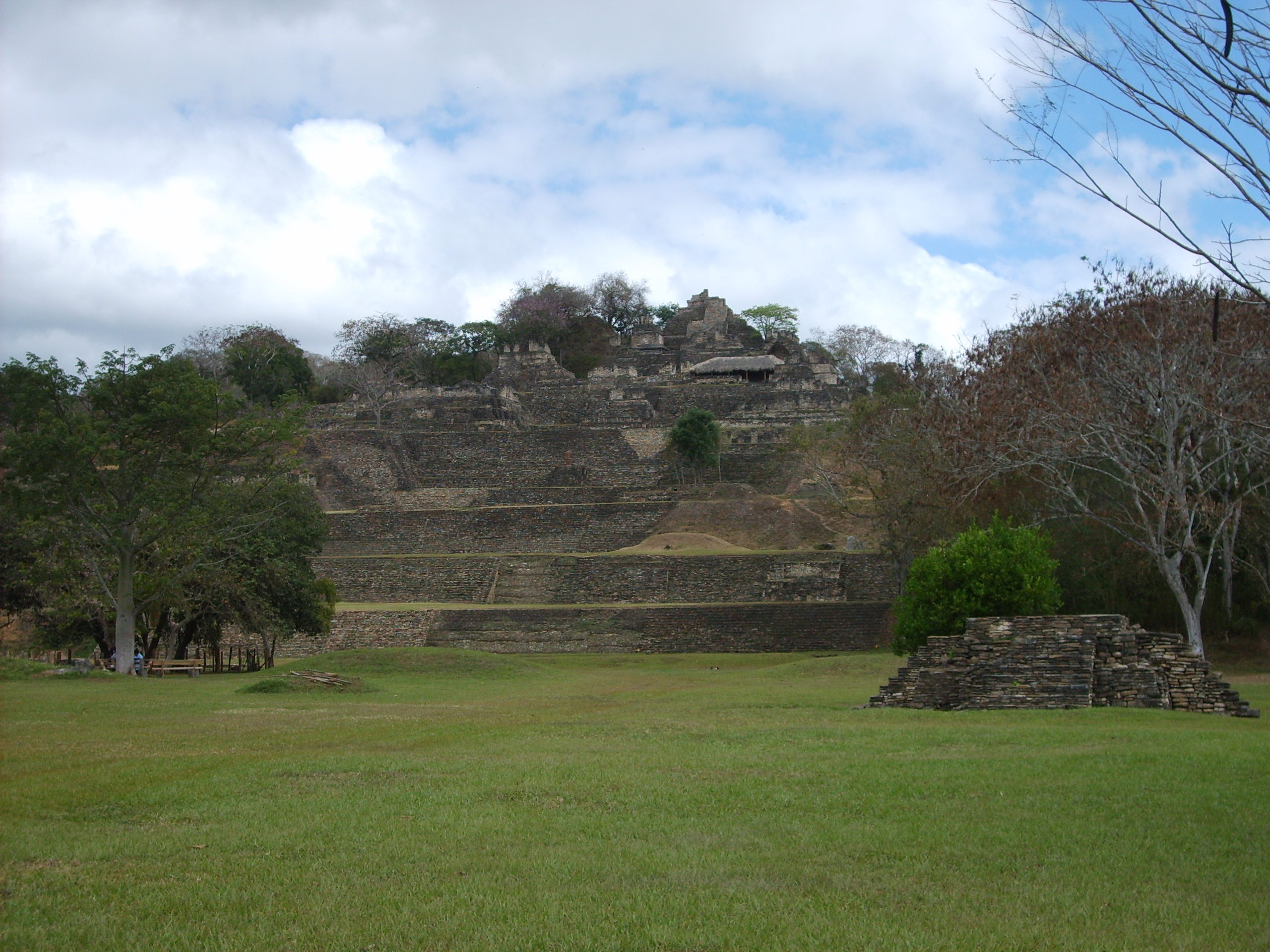
The Acropolis of Toniná, occupying seven terraces upon a hillside.

The site was built on a platform covering 6 hectares (650,000 sq ft). The principal architecture is located in the acropolis, which occupies seven south-facing terraces on the northern side of the platform, rising 71 metres (233 ft) over the plaza below. It has a more distinct geometry than at most Maya sites, with a right-angle relationship between most structures.

Much of the public imagery of the site details the ruthless manner in which the city dealt with its enemies. A 16 by 4 metres (52 by 13 ft) stucco sculpture rising from the fourth to fifth terraces depicts a skeletal death god carrying the severed head of a lord of Palenque in one hand. A frieze on the fifth terrace probably displayed Toniná's most distinguished victims, dozens of fragments of this frieze were discovered in the plaza below. This frieze was carved from the local sandstone but its style is that of Palenque, suggesting that captured artists carried out the work.

After the abandonment of the city at the end of the Classic Period, many of the sculptures fell down the steep embankment supporting the seven terraces.

=== Structures ===
Ballcourt 1 (the Sunken Ballcourt) was dedicated in 699 by K'inich B'aaknal Chaak to mark three victories over K'inich Kan Balam II of Palenque. Sculptures of the torsos of six captured vassals of the Palenque king were used as ballcourt markers. One of these vassals is named as Yax Ahk (Green Turtle), who was the lord of Annay Te', a site that probably lay on the south side of the Usumacinta between Piedras Negras and Yaxchilán.

Ballcourt 2 is the smaller of the two ballcourts and lies in the north of the plaza, at the foot of the Acropolis.

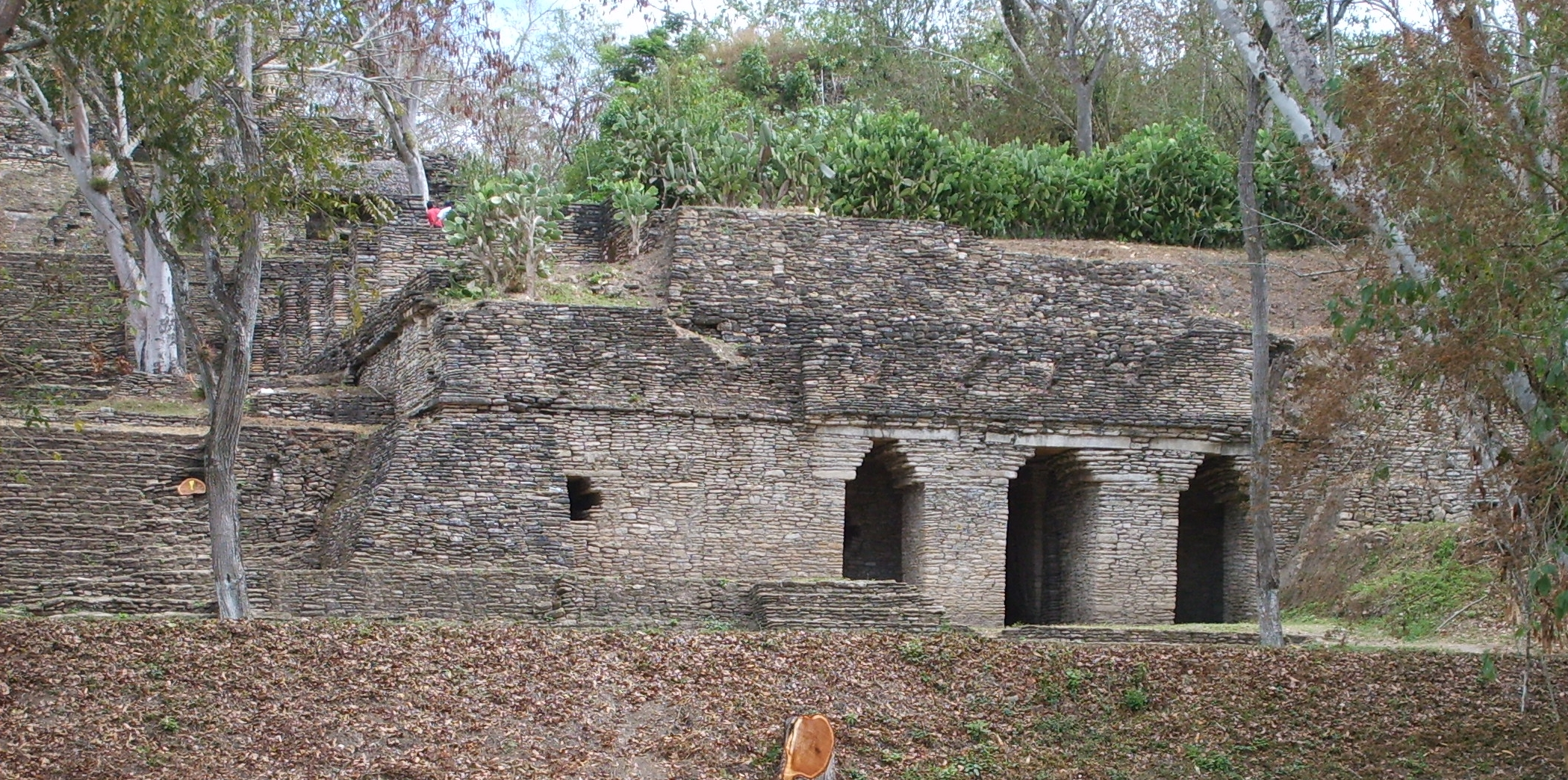
The entrances to the Palace of the Underworld.

The Palace of the Underworld is entered via three step-vaulted arches on the eastern side of the second terrace of the Acropolis.

The Palace of Frets is located on the fourth terrace of the Acropolis. The south facade of the palace is decorated with four large stepped frets. On the east side of the palace a stairway leads to a decorated throne of stone and stucco. One of the rooms of the palace contains a stucco decoration representing feathered serpents and crossed bones.

=== Monuments and sculptures ===
The monuments of Toniná tend to be smaller than those at other Maya sites, with most of the stelae measuring less than 2 metres (6.6 ft) tall. The most important difference from monuments at other Maya sites is that they are carved in the round like statues, often with hieroglyphic text running down the spine. On the fifth terrace, in-the-round sculptures of Toniná's rulers dominated two-dimensional representations of defeated enemies.

The dated monuments at Toniná span the period from AD 495 to 909, covering most of the Classic Period.

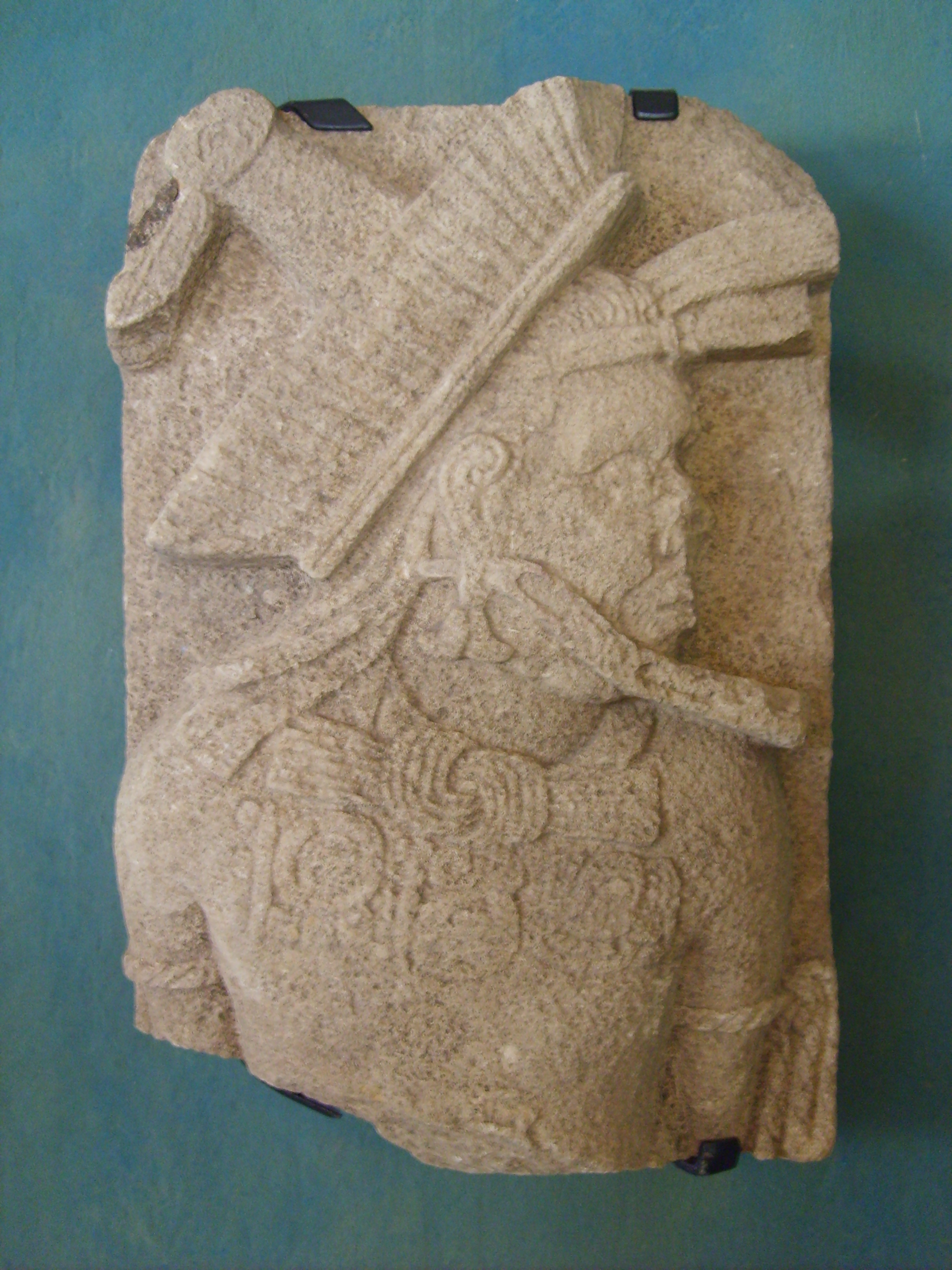
Sculpture of a bound captive in the Toniná site museum.

Monument 3 is broken into various fragments, five of which were recovered from various locations in Ocosingo and Toniná through the course of the 20th century and most of which were reunited in the Toniná site museum. Aside from being broken, the stela is largely complete and only lightly eroded, it is a statue of a ruler with inscriptions describing the accession of K'inich Baaknal Chaak and the promotion to the priesthood of Aj Ch'aaj Naah.

Monument 5 was recovered from a school in Ocosingo and moved to the site museum of Toniná. It is a badly eroded life-size human statue with the head missing.

Monument 7 is carved from yellow sandstone and has suffered only minor damage. It is a stela base with well-preserved hieroglyphs on all four vertical sides and was dedicated by K'inich Ich'aak Chapat in 728. It is currently in the Museo Regional in Tuxtla Gutiérrez.

Monument 8 dates to the reign of Ruler 2. It marks the period ending of 682 and shows the presentation of three war captives.

Monument 12 is a sculpture carved in the round, representing Ruler 2. It dates to AD 672.

Monument 27 is a carved step depicting K'awiil Mo', a lord from Palenque, as an elderly prisoner, bound and lying on his back with his profile positioned in such a way as to be trodden on time and again.

Monument 99 is an undated fragment that depicts a female captive, which is rare in Maya art.

Monument 101 has the last Long Count date from any Maya monument, it marks the K'atun ending of AD 909.

Monument 106 is the earliest securely dated monument at the site, dating to AD 593. It depicts Ruler 1.

Monument 113 depicts Ruler 2 participating in a scattering ritual.

Monument 114 was dedicated in 794 by Ruler 8. It commemorates the death of an important noble, apparently a relative or vassal of Ruler 8's predecessor Tuun Chapat.

Monument 122 is a low relief sculpture marking the defeat of Palenque by Ruler 4 in 711 and the capture of Kan Joy Chitam II, who is depicted as a bound captive.

Monument 141 is a very well preserved hieroglyphic panel carved from fine grained white limestone with almost the whole inscription intact. It describes the dedication of a ballcourt by K'inich B'aaknal Chaak.

Monument 154 dates to the reign of K'inich Hix Chapat and records his installing of two subordinate lords in 633.

Monument 158 has a very late date, in AD 904, at the very end of the Classic Period. It was erected during the reign of Ruler 10.

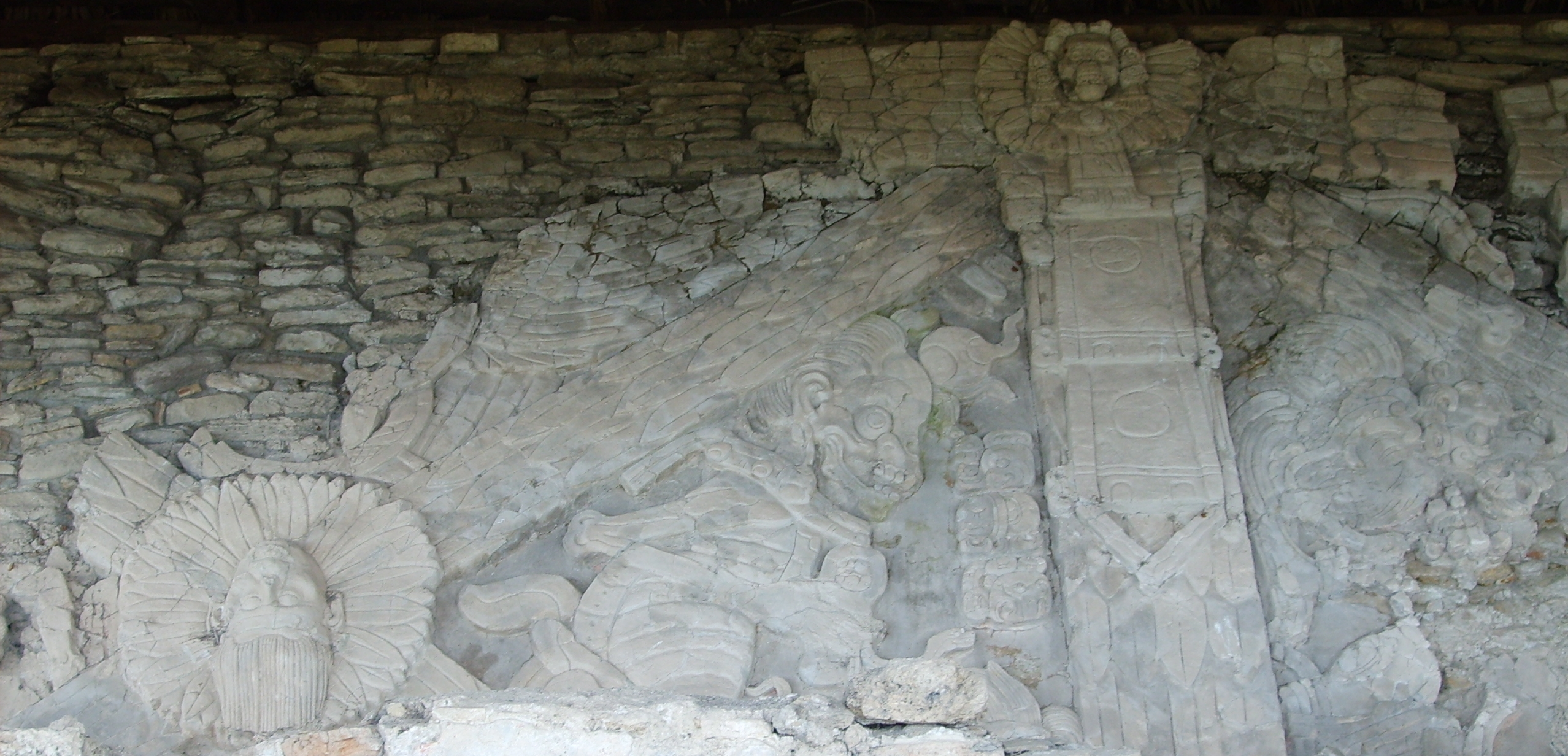
Stucco sculpture of the skeletal spirit companion of a Maya lord within a feathered scaffold, from the Frieze of the Dream Lords.

The Frieze of the Dream Lords (also known as the Frieze of the Four Suns or Frieze of the Four Eras) was uncovered by archaeologists during excavations in 1992. It is a stucco mural located at the east end of the 5th terrace. It represents a complex supernatural scene divided into four by a feather-covered scaffold from which hang the severed heads of sacrificial victims. Among the scaffold partitions are depicted the wayob (spirit companions) of the Maya elite. The most well-preserved section of the sculpture depicts a skeletal supernatural way named Ak Ok Kimi ("Turtle Foot Death") wearing turtleshells on its feet and carrying a severed head in one hand, interpreted as the way of a lord from the site of Pipa'. The frieze was once brightly painted in red, blue and yellow. This frieze has strong stylistic parallels with mural paintings at the great Early Classic metropolis of Teotihuacan in the distant Valley of Mexico.

=== Site museum ===
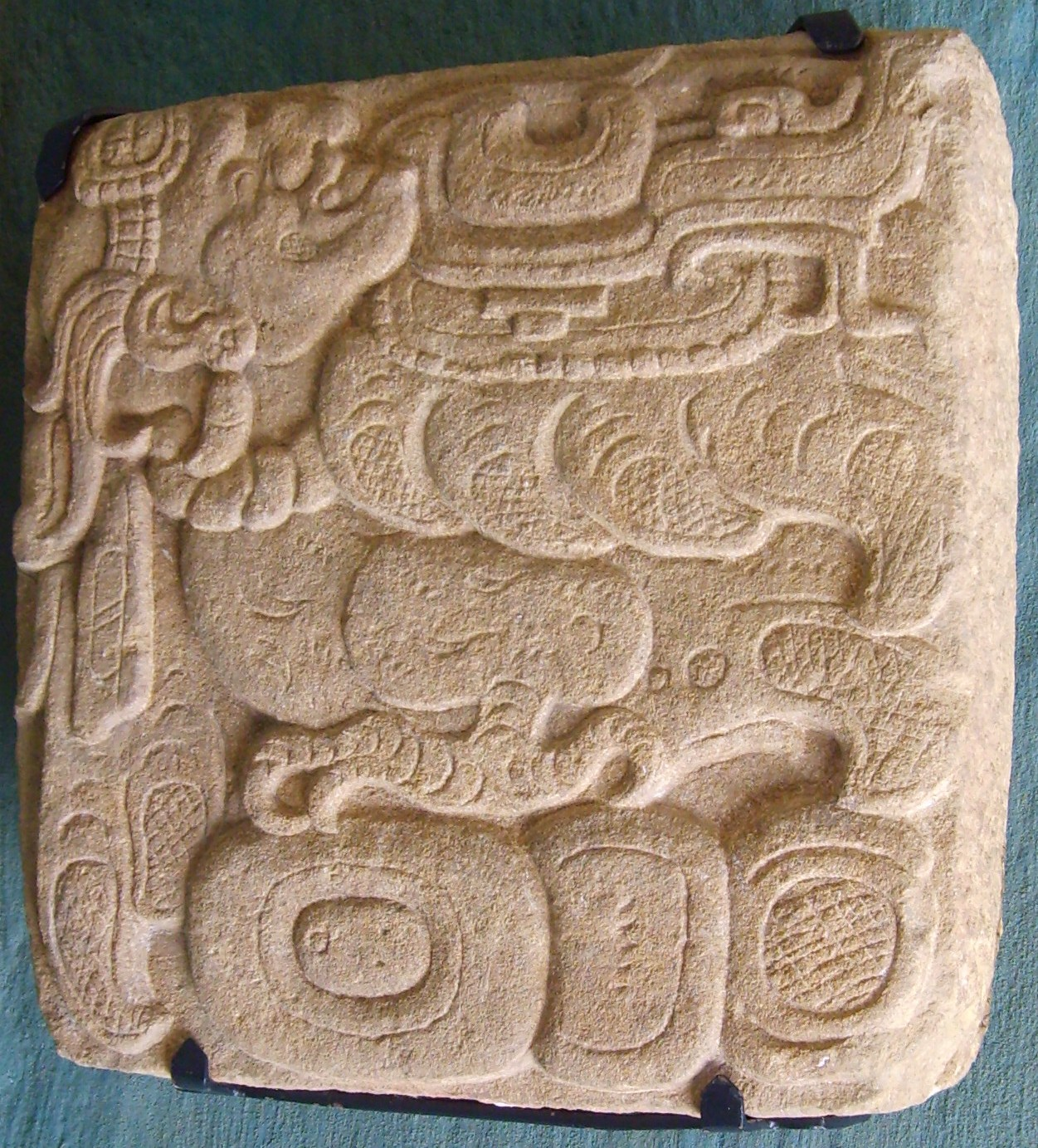
Glyph with a representation of Itzamna, the supreme god of creation and destruction, in the site museum of Toniná.

The site museum is located 300 metres (980 ft) outside of the Toniná archaeological zone. It possesses 2 exhibition rooms and a conference room. The first room explains the pyramidal form of the acropolis and how it relates to Maya mythology, while the main room contains sculptures of the city's rulers.

Artefacts in the collection include stone sculptures, ceramics and artefacts sculpted from bone, shell, obsidian and flint. The pieces in the museum graphically depict the two sides of the power exercised by Toniná, on the one hand with sculptures of the city's rulers and on the other with its depictions of bound prisoners of war.

== Notes ==
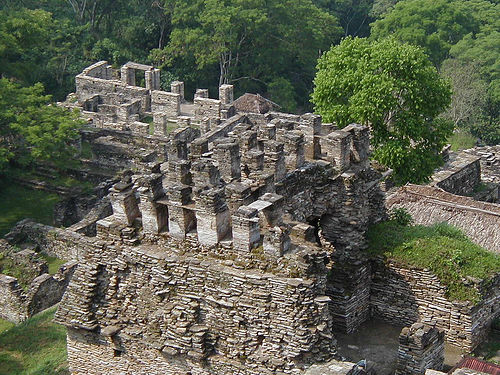
A view from the top of a pyramid.
