= Pre-Columbian Mexico =

Mexico before Spanish colonization

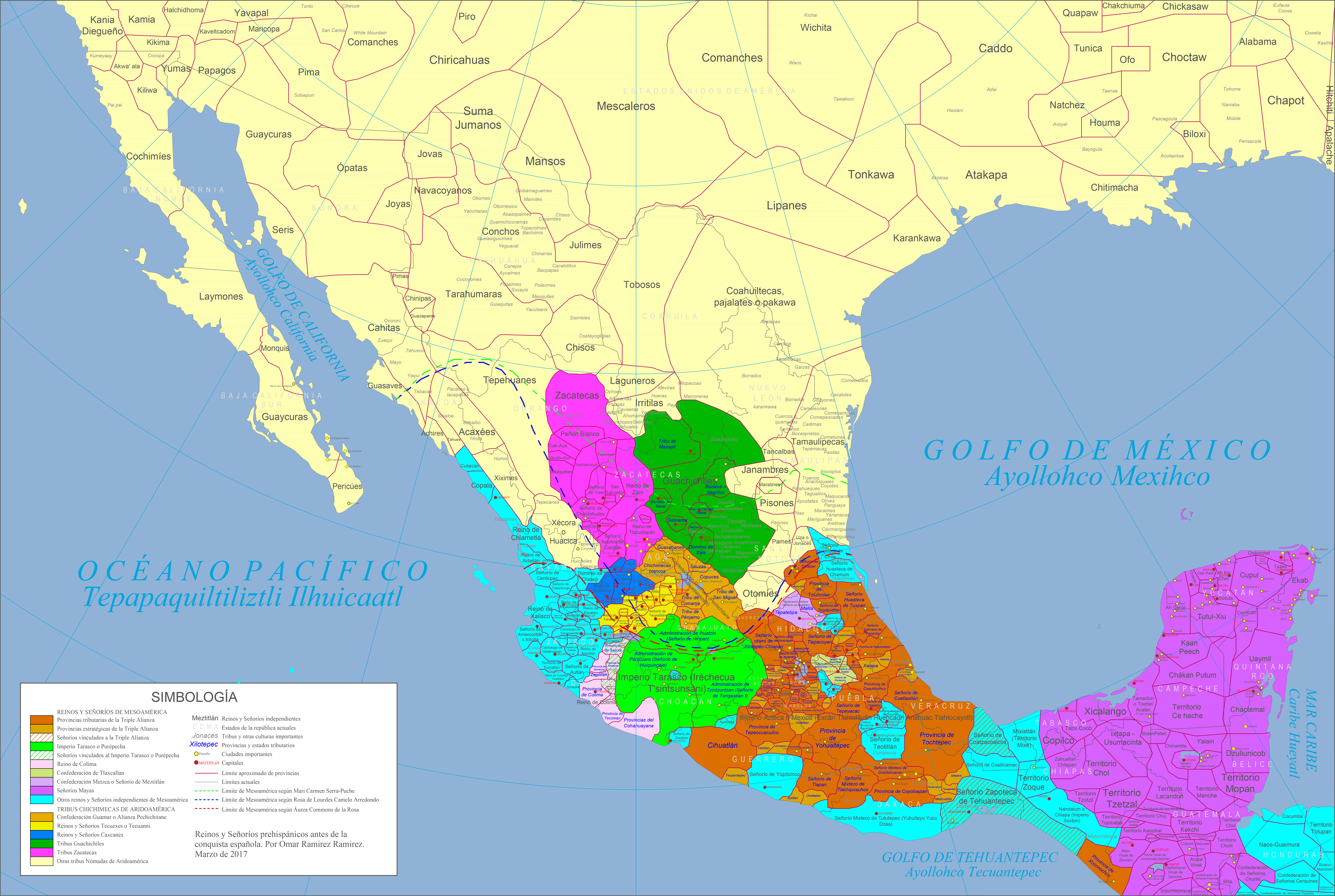
Map of pre-Columbian states of Mexico just before the Spanish conquest.

The pre-Columbian (or pre-Hispanic) history of the territory now making up the country of Mexico is known through the work of archaeologists and epigraphers, and through the accounts of Spanish conquistadores, settlers, and clergymen, as well as those of the indigenous chroniclers of the immediate post-conquest period.

Human presence in the Mexican region was once thought to date back 40,000 years, based upon what were believed to be ancient human footprints discovered in the Valley of Mexico; but, after further investigation using radioactive dating, it appears that this was an overestimate. It is currently unclear whether 21,000-year-old campfire remains found in the Valley of Mexico are the earliest human remains in Mexico. Indigenous peoples of Mexico began to selectively breed maize plants around 8000 BC. Evidence shows a marked increase in pottery working by 2300 BC and the beginning of intensive corn farming between 1800 and 1500 BC.

Between 1800 and 300 BC, complex cultures began to form. Many matured into advanced Mesoamerican civilizations such as the: Olmec, Izapa, Teotihuacan, Maya, Zapotec, Mixtec, Huastec, Purépecha, Totonac, Toltec, and Aztec, which flourished for nearly 4,000 years before the first contact with Europeans.

== Accomplishments ==
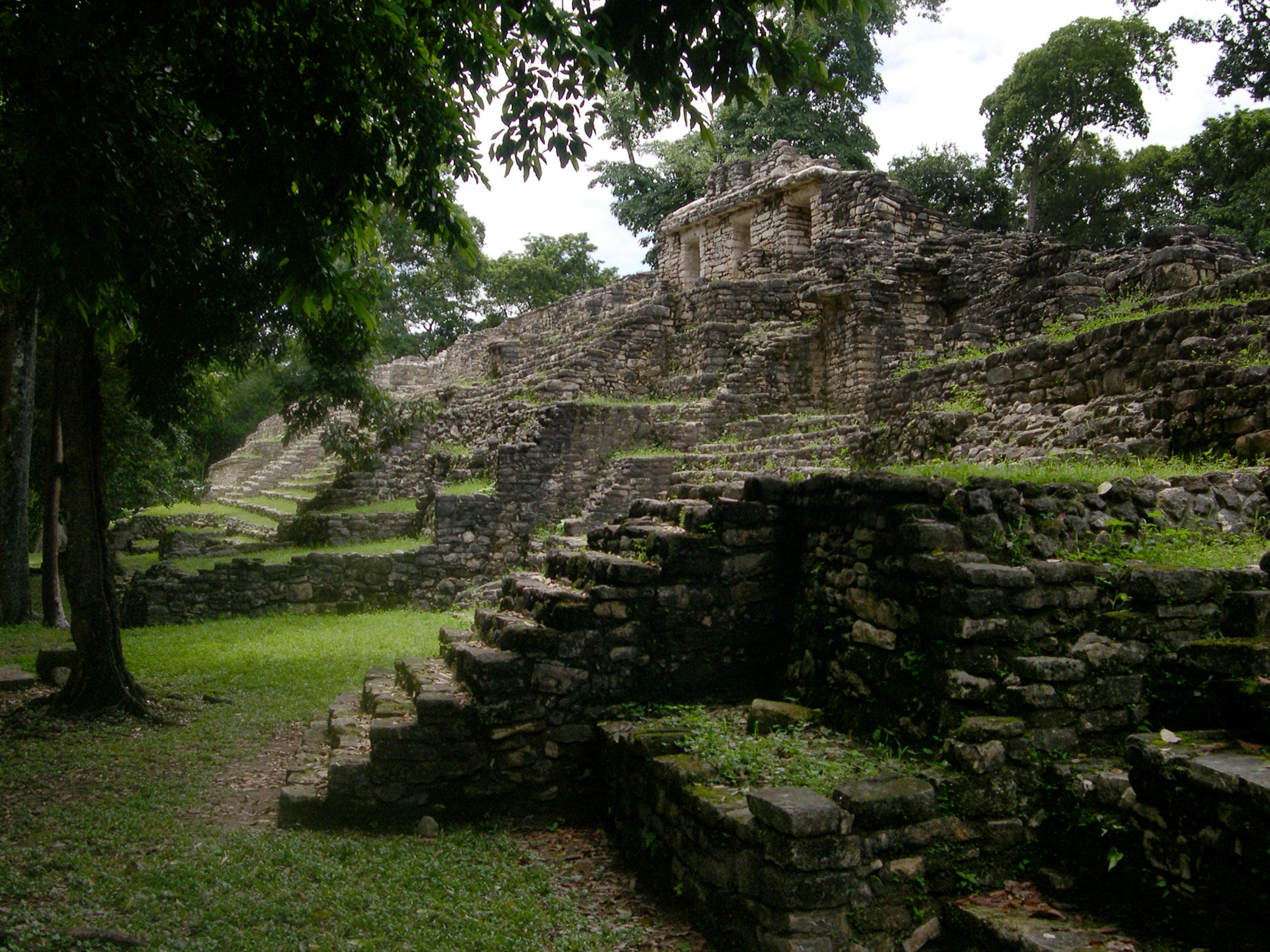
An image of one of the pyramids in the upper level of Yaxchilán

These civilizations are credited with many inventions and advancements including pyramid-temples, mathematics (such as the development of the concept of zero as early as 36 BC and working with sums of hundreds of millions), astronomy (measuring the length of the solar year to a high degree of accuracy), medicine, and theology.

Archaic inscriptions on rocks and rock walls all over northern Mexico (especially in the state of Nuevo León) demonstrate an early propensity for counting in Mexico. These very early and ancient count-markings were associated with astronomical events and underscore the influence that astronomical activities had upon Mexican natives, even before they possessed urbanization.

In fact, many of the later Mexican-based civilizations would carefully build their cities and ceremonial centers according to specific astronomical events. Astronomy and the notion of human observation of celestial events would become central factors in the development of religious systems, writing systems, fine arts, and architecture.

Prehistoric Mexican astronomers began a tradition of precise observing, recording, and commemorating astronomical events that later become a hallmark of Mexican civilized achievements. Cities would be founded and built on astronomical principles, leaders would be appointed on celestial events, wars would be fought according to solar-calendars, and a complex theology using astronomical metaphors would organize the daily lives of millions of people.

At some different points in time, three Mexican cities (Teotihuacan, Tenochtitlan, and Cholula) were among the largest cities in the world. These cities and several others blossomed as centers of commerce, ideas, ceremonies, and theology. In turn, they radiated influence outward into neighboring cultures in central Mexico.

== Aridoamerica and Oasisamerica ==
At its height, Aridoamerica covered part of the present-day Mexican states of Chihuahua, Sonora, and Baja California, while Oasisamerica as the U.S. states of Arizona, Utah, New Mexico, Colorado, Nevada, and parts of California. Cultural groups that flourished in Aridoamerica, mostly within the borders of modern-day Mexico include the Mogollon, Patayan, and Hohokam. These two cultural regions maintained long-distance trade networks with Mesoamerica, evidenced by cacao, macaws, and other Mesoamerican goods found in Ancestral Pueblo sites, and turquoise from Oasisamerica found in precontact Mesoamerican artwork. For example, in Paquimé, a site connected to the Mogollon culture, there have been found ceremonial structures related to Mesoamerican religion, similar to the juego de pelota.

== Mesoamerica ==
While many city-states, kingdoms, and empires competed with one another for power and prestige, Mexico can be said to have had seven major civilizations: The Olmec, Teotihuacan, the Toltec, the Aztec, Zapotec, Mixtec, and the Maya. These civilizations (with the exception of the politically fragmented Maya) extended their reach across Mexico, and beyond, like no others. They consolidated power and distributed influence in matters of trade, art, politics, technology, and theology. Other regional power players made economic and political alliances with these seven civilizations over the span of 3,000 years. Many made war with them. But almost all found themselves within these seven spheres of influence.

=== Olmec civilization ===
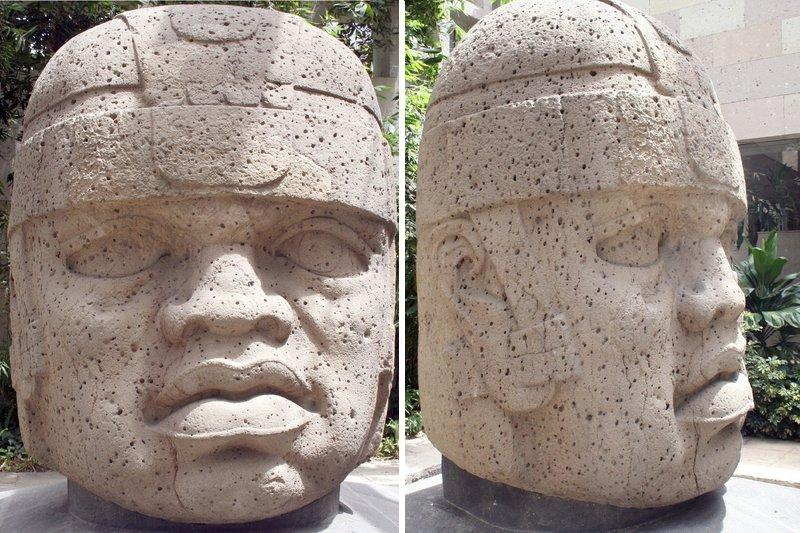
Olmec colossal head 1, at Jalapa.

The Olmec were an ancient Pre-Columbian people living in the tropical lowlands of south-central Mexico, roughly in what are the modern-day states of Veracruz and Tabasco on the Isthmus of Tehuantepec. Their immediate cultural influence, however, extends far beyond this region. The Olmec flourished during the Formative (or Preclassic) period, dating from 1400 BC to about 400 BC, and are believed to have been the progenitor civilization of later Mesoamerican civilizations.

=== Teotihuacan civilization ===
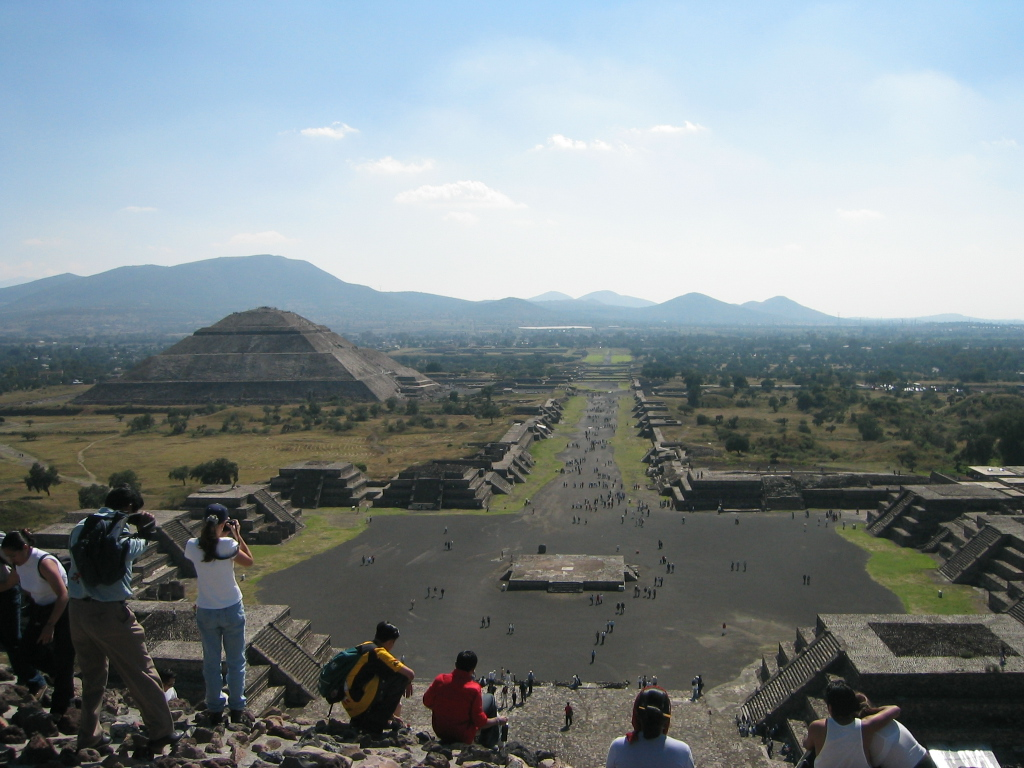
View of Avenue of the Dead from Pyramid of the Moon

The decline of the Olmec resulted in a power vacuum in Mexico. Emerging from that vacuum was Teotihuacan, first settled in 300 BC. By AD 150, it had grown to become the first true metropolis of what is now called North America. Teotihuacan established a new economic and political order never before seen in Mexico. Its influence stretched across Mexico into Central America, such as Monte Albán, Cerro de las Mesas, Matacapan, Tikal, and Kaminaljuyú. Teotihuacan's influence over the Maya civilization cannot be overstated; it transformed political power, artistic depictions, and the nature of economics. Within the city of Teotihuacan was a diverse and cosmopolitan population.

Most of the regional ethnicities of Mexico were represented in the city. They lived in rural apartment communities where they worked their trades and contributed to the city's economic and cultural prowess. By AD 500, Teotihuacan had become one of the largest cities in the world with a population of 100,000 people. Teotihuacan's economic pull impacted areas in northern Mexico as well. It was a city whose monumental architecture reflected a new era in Mexican civilization, declining in political power about AD 650, but lasting in cultural influence for the better part of a millennium, to around AD 950.

=== Maya civilization ===
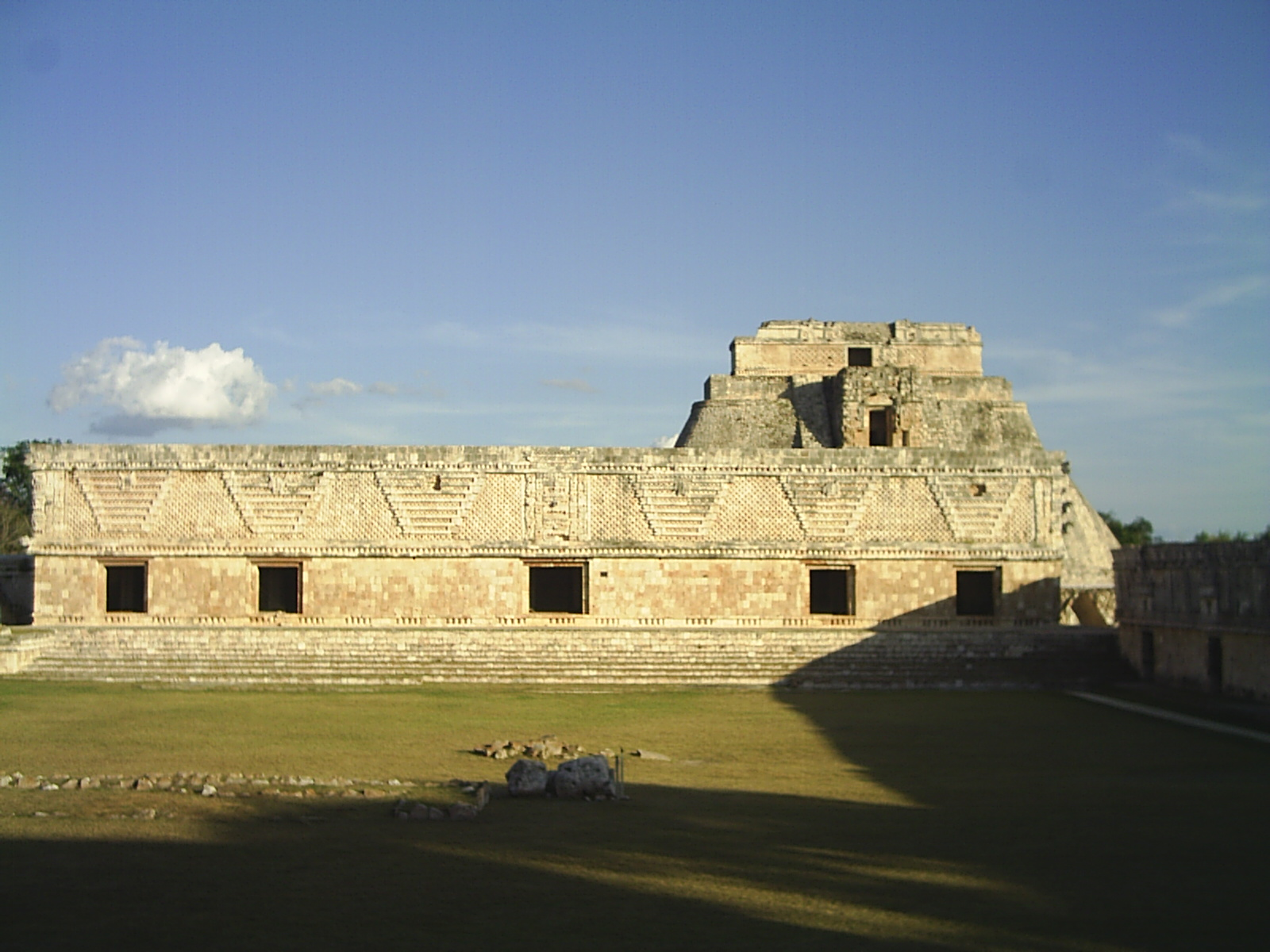
Mayan architecture at Uxmal

Contemporary with Teotihuacan's greatness was the greatness of the Mayan civilization. The period between AD 250 and AD 650 saw an intense flourishing of Maya civilized accomplishments. While the many Maya city-states never achieved political unity on the order of the central Mexican civilizations, they exerted a tremendous intellectual influence upon Mexico. The Maya built some of the most elaborate cities on the continent, and made innovations in mathematics, astronomy, and writing that became the pinnacle of Mexico's scientific achievements.

=== Toltec civilization ===
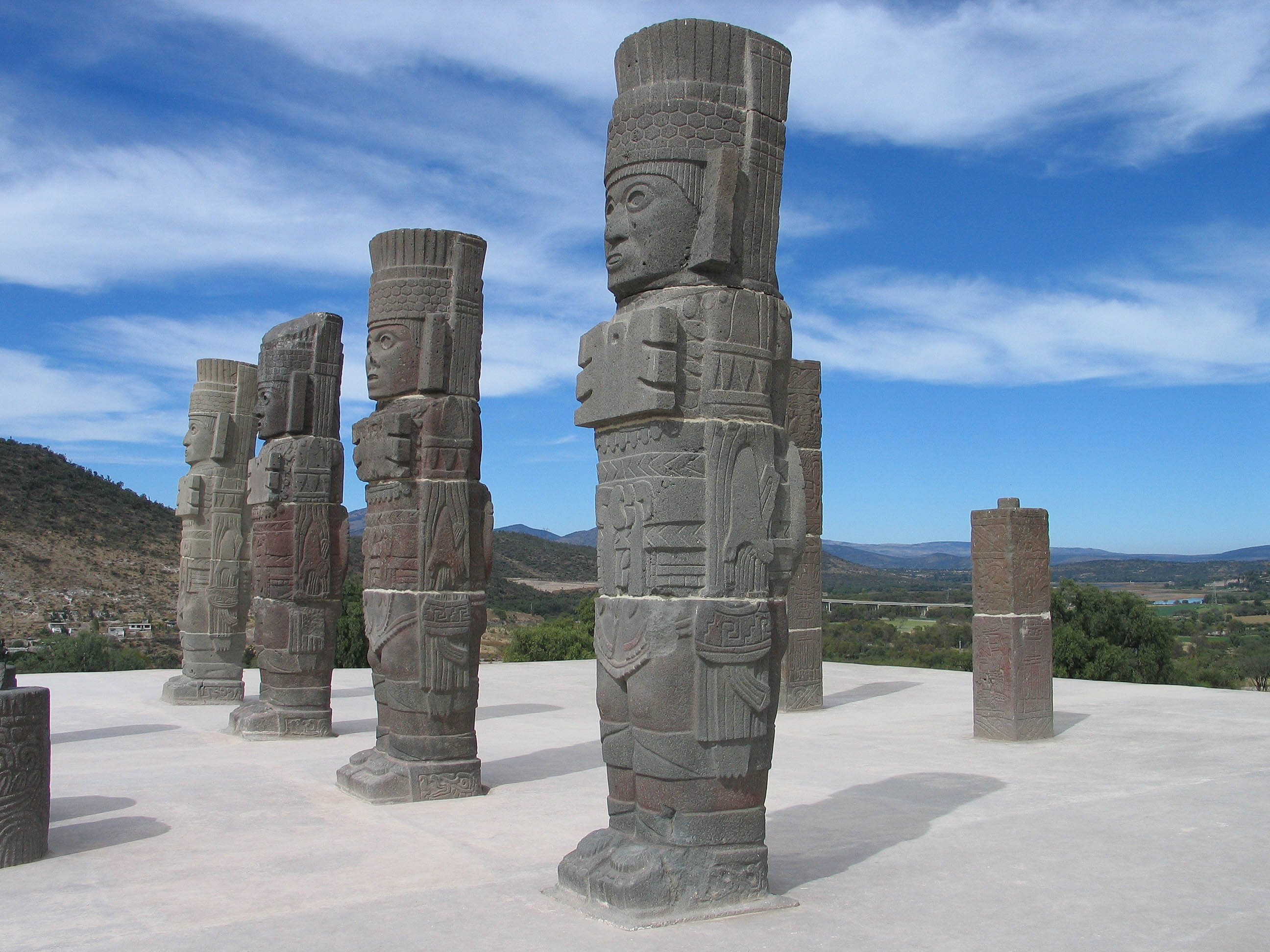
Toltec warrior columns at Tollan (Tula), Hidalgo

Just as Teotihuacan had emerged from a power vacuum, so too did the Toltec civilization, which took the reins of cultural and political power in Mexico from about 700. The Toltec empire established contact as far south as Central America, and as far north as the Anasazi corn culture in the Southwestern United States. The Toltec established a prosperous turquoise trade route with the northern civilization of Pueblo Bonito, in modern-day New Mexico. The Mayan city of Chichen Itza was also in contact with the Toltec civilization were powerfully influenced by central Mexicans as noted by the use of the Chac Mool, Atlantean figures, feathered serpents, and skull platforms. The Toltecs were about to melt and work precious metals such as gold and silver, they cultivated maguey and produced both pulque and clothes from the plant, and they were the employed cocoa beans in trade. The Toltec political system was so influential, that many future Mesoamerican dynasties would later claim to be of Toltec descent. Désiré Charnay theorized Toltec migrations originated from Asia due to similarities to Japanese architecture, Chinese decoration, Malaysian language, and Cambodian dress.

=== Aztec civilization ===
With the decline of the Toltec civilization came political fragmentation in the Valley of Mexico, and into this new game of political contenders for the Toltec throne stepped outsiders: the Aztec. Newcomers to the Valley of Mexico, they were seen as crude and unrefined in the eyes of the existing Mesoamerican civilizations, such as the fallen Toltec empire.

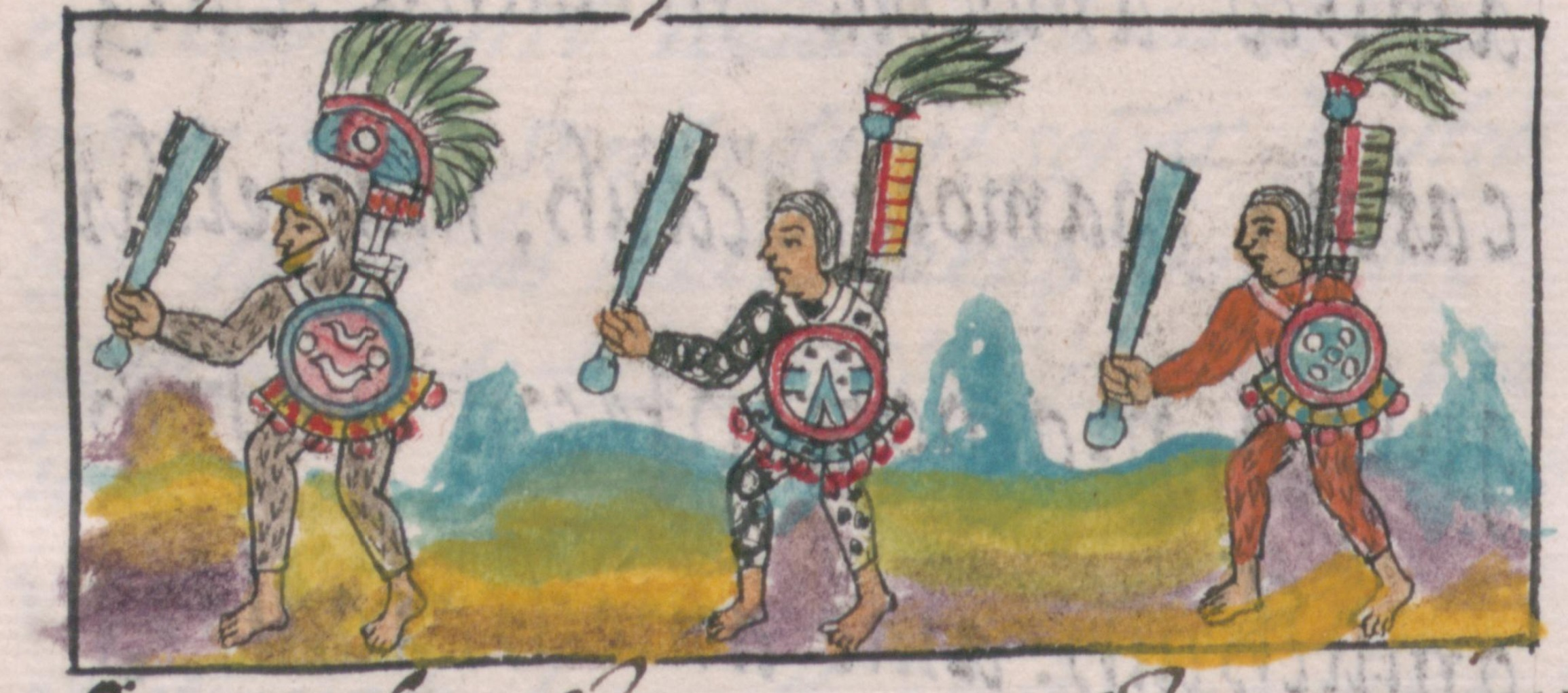
Aztec warriors as shown in the Florentine Codex.

Latecomers to Mexico's central plateau, the Aztecs thought of themselves as heirs to the prestigious civilizations that had preceded them, much as Charlemagne did with respect to the fallen Roman Empire. What the Aztecs lacked in political power, they made up for with ambition and military skill.

In 1428, the Aztecs led a war of liberation against their rulers from the city of Azcapotzalco, which had subjugated most of the Valley of Mexico's peoples. The revolt was successful, and the Aztecs, through cunning political maneuvers and ferocious fighting skills, managed to pull off a true "rags-to-riches" story: they became the rulers of central Mexico as the leaders of the Triple Alliance.

This Alliance was composed of the city-states of Tenochtitlan, Texcoco, and Tlacopan. At their peak, 300,000 Aztecs presided over a wealthy tribute-empire comprising 4 to 7 million people and extended into Central America. The westward expansion of the empire was stopped cold by a devastating military defeat at the hands of the Purépecha (who possessed state-of-the-art copper-metal weapons). The empire relied upon a system of taxation (of goods and services) which were collected through an elaborate bureaucracy of tax collectors, courts, civil servants, and local officials who were installed as loyalists to the Triple Alliance (led by Tenochtitlan).

The empire was primarily economic in nature, and the Triple Alliance grew very rich: libraries were built, monumental architecture was constructed, and a highly prestigious artistic and priestly class was cultivated. All of this created a "First World" aura of invincibility around the island-city of Tenochtitlan. Unlike the later Spanish, the Aztecs did not seek to "convert" or destroy the cultures they conquered. Quite the opposite: the engines of warfare and empire in Central Mexico required that all participants understand and accept common cultural "rules" in order to make the flow of imperial wealth as smooth as possible. The rules of empire in Mexico were old rules, understood by all the power players and "contenders to the throne," as had been shown many times before (the kingdom of Tlaxcala would attempt its own power grab in 1519 by using the Spanish as mercenary-allies).

Founded around 1325, the Aztec capital, Mexico-Tenochtitlan, was by 1519 among the largest cities in the world with a population of around 300,000 (although some estimates range as high as 500,000). Beijing at the same time had a population variously estimated to be 670,000 up to one million people. By comparison, the population of Venice, the largest city in Europe in 1519, was 100,000 people. Tenochtitlan is the site of modern-day Mexico City.

=== Allies of the Aztecs ===
In the formation of the Triple Alliance empire, the Aztecs established several ally states. Among them were Cholula, Texcoco, Tlacopan, and Matatlan. Also, many of the kingdoms conquered by the Aztecs provided soldiers for further imperial campaigns such as: Culhuacan, Xochimilco, Tepeacac, Amecameca, Coaixtlahuacan, Cuetlachtlan, Ahuilizipan. The Aztec war machine would become multi-ethnic, comprising soldiers from conquered areas, led by a large core of Aztec warriors and officers.

== Recent discoveries ==
In May 2020, discovery of remains of at least sixty mammoths (included male, female, young mammoths) and 15 people were uncovered by the National Institute of Anthropology and History headed by archaeologist Sánchez Nava under the Mexico City Santa-Lucia airport site named Zumpango, in the former Lake Xaltocan. According to the INAH, mammoth skeletons revealed in what used to be the shallow part of the lake were better anatomically preserved than those found in the deeper parts of the former lake. Mammoths probably got stuck in the lake and died.

In July 2020, archaeologists unearthed two pre-Hispanic stone monuments believed to have been built by the Zapotecs 1500 years ago on top of the Cerro de Peña mountain in Puebla state. National Institute of Anthropology and History also revealed two stelae, small carved animals and figures. One of the carvings described a figure with horns and claws wearing a loincloth.

== Legacy of the Aztecs ==
The Aztecs left a durable stamp upon modern Mexican culture. Much of what is considered modern Mexican culture derives from the Aztec civilization: place-names, words, food, art, dress, symbols, and even the name "Mexican". (See also Origin and history of the name "Mexico-Tenochtitlan").

=== Mexico City as the capital ===
Today, the Aztec's capital city of Mexico-Tenochtitlan survives in modern times as Mexico City, the capital of the modern nation of Mexico. Mexico City is the largest metropolitan area in the Western Hemisphere (and fifth-largest in the world with 21.2 million inhabitants).

The Spanish retained the original layout of the city of Tenochtitlan, reflected today in the various city districts (barrios) and in the central precinct of the Zócalo (formerly the ceremonial center of Tenochtitlan). Many streets and boulevards lay along the same paths as the previous water canals of Tenochtitlan. Several pyramids and ruins have even remain unearthed within the urban sprawl of the city. Following independence and after a number of floods, the lakes of the valley were drained, drastically changing the landscape. The former island city now was able to spread over a dry plain. Only small remnants of the old canal city remain, such as in the celebrated flower district of Xochimilco. Today, Mexico City incorporates almost 9 million people, whereas, in 1519, that number was 300,000.

=== Food and cuisine ===
==== Foods originating from Mexico ====
Mexico is a Megadiverse country. As such, many ingredients commonly consumed by today's people worldwide originate from Mexico. The names of the various foods are originally from Nahuatl. Examples of such ingredients are: Chocolate, Tomato, Maize, Vanilla, Avocado, Guava, Chayote, Epazote, Camote, Jícama, Tejocote, Nopal, Sapote, Chipotle, many varieties of modern Beans.

==== Mexican cuisine ====
The majority of Mexico's cuisine are of indigenous origins and are based on the ingredients listed above:

- corn enters in the composition of tortillas, tamales, pozole, enchiladas, chilaquiles, tostadas
- avocado is the principal ingredient of guacamole
- chocolate is used in mole and atole
- agave is the basis of several drinks: tequila, mezcal, pulque
- chili peppers add a spicy flavor to many dishes

These foods continue to make up the core of Mexican cuisine today.

=== Nahuatl language ===
Because the Mexica spoke Nahuatl (the most common language at the time of Spanish arrival) their terms and names were widespread as descriptors of cities, regions, valleys, rivers, mountains, and many cultural objects. The Tlaxcaltec allies of the Spanish also spoke Nahuatl and they accompanied the Spanish in the conquest of much of what would become New Spain. As a result, Nahuatl names were used as geographic identifiers as far away as Guatemala and Sonora (e.g. Qʼumarkaj was known by its Nahuatl name Utatlan; "Guatemala" comes from Quauhtemallan, the Nahuatl name for Iximche, the capital of the Kaqchikel people) and Suchitlán in the northern state of Coahuila on the southern Texas border.

Numerous words from the Nahuatl language, referred to as Nahuatlismos, have been borrowed both by standard Spanish and Mexican Spanish. English and other languages have borrowed a number of words indirectly from Nahuatl through Spanish such as "avocado", "chili", "tomato", "chocolate", and "coyote".

Today, approximately 1.5 million indigenous Nahua people continue to speak the Nahuatl language. Recent years have seen a resurgence of interest in learning Nahuatl by Spanish-speaking and English-speaking Mexicans at-large.

=== Flag of Mexico ===
While different standards and flags were used during the pre-Hispanic period, the viceroyalty, and the Mexican War of Independence, the modern flag has its origins in the flag of the Army of the Three Guarantees in 1821. Today it consists of a rectangle with a green stripe on the left (signifying the Independence Movement), a white stripe in the middle (originally signifying the purity of the Catholic faith), and a red stripe on the right (signifying the blood of the fighters). There is a coat of arms in the center.

The coat of arms represents the legendary founding of the city of Tenochtitlan. According to legend, the gods had advised the Aztecs that they should establish their city when they saw an eagle, perched on a prickly pear tree, devouring a serpent; after years of wandering, they found such an eagle on an island in Lake Texcoco, in what was to become the main plaza of Mexico City.

The flag has undergone several changes since 1821; the last was in 1968.

=== Art and symbols ===
Mexican art has inspired generations of Mexican-descent artists, both inside and outside of Mexico's modern borders. Images of pyramids, the "Aztec calendar", and armed indigenous warriors have been popular themes. Also popular have been zigzag motifs (found on indigenous buildings and pottery) and the theological notion of The Four Directions (found among indigenous cultures across the Western Hemisphere). In recent years, there has been a resurgence of interest in the ceremonies and art of the Day of the Dead. The art, architecture, and symbols of the Mexica civilization exert such a unique identity that they are commonly used in advertisements for tourism to Mexico.

== See also ==
- Economy of Prehispanic Mexico
