= Walter Lehmann =

Walter Lehmann may refer to:

- Walter Lehmann (ethnologist) (1878–1939), German ethnologist, linguist and archeologist
- Walter Lehmann (gymnast) (1919–2017), Swiss gymnast
