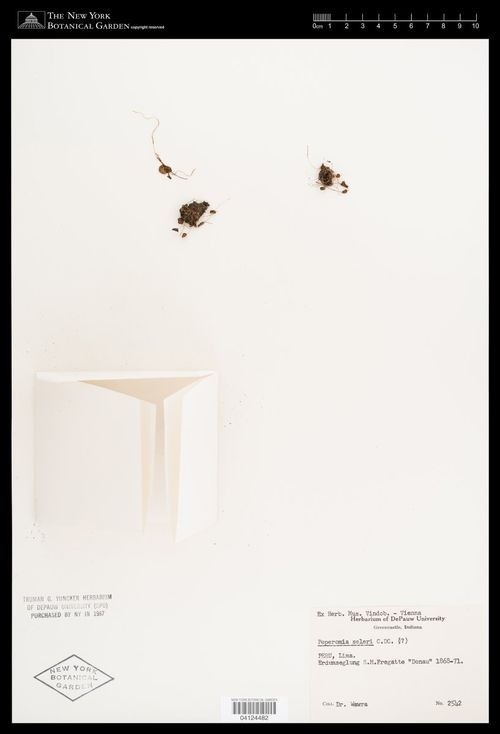

Scientific classification
- Kingdom: Plantae
- Clade: Tracheophytes
- Clade: Angiosperms
- Clade: Magnoliids
- Order: Piperales
- Family: Piperaceae
- Genus: Peperomia
- Species: P. seleri

Binomial name
- Peperomia seleri C. DC.

= Peperomia seleri =

Species of epiphyte

Peperomia seleri is a species of epiphyte in the genus Peperomia that is native to Peru. It grows on wet tropical biomes. Its conservation status is Threatened.

== Description ==
The type specimen were collected at Cerro de Amazonas, Peru.

Peperomia seleri is a saxicolous herb, probably tuberous, with glabrous leaves on long petioles. The petiole is filiform, 3.5 cm long, several times longer than the blade. The blade is ovate, peltate about one-third above the base, membranaceous when dry, about 6.5 cm long and 4 cm wide, with inconspicuous nerves. The peduncles are filiform, glabrous, nearly equaling the petioles. The spikes are glabrous, slightly shorter than the peduncle, filiform. The bract has an ovate pelt, acutely acuminate at the apex, pedicellate at the center, 0.75 mm long. The anthers are rounded, shorter than the rather long filament. The ovary is emergent, ovate-oblong, produced above into a short cylindrical style bearing a stigma at the apex; the stigma is glabrous. The berry is ovate, somewhat roughened with glands.

== Taxonomy and naming ==
It was described in 1920 by Casimir de Candolle in the Annuaire du Conservatoire et du Jardin botaniques de Genève, from specimens collected by Eduard Seler. It was named in honor of the collector Eduard Seler.

== Distribution and habitat ==
It is native to Peru. It grows as a saxicolous plant and is a herb. It grows on wet tropical biomes.

== Conservation ==
This species is assessed as Threatened, in a preliminary report.
