= Lienzo Seler Coixtlahuaca II =

16th-century Mesoamerican pictorial manuscript

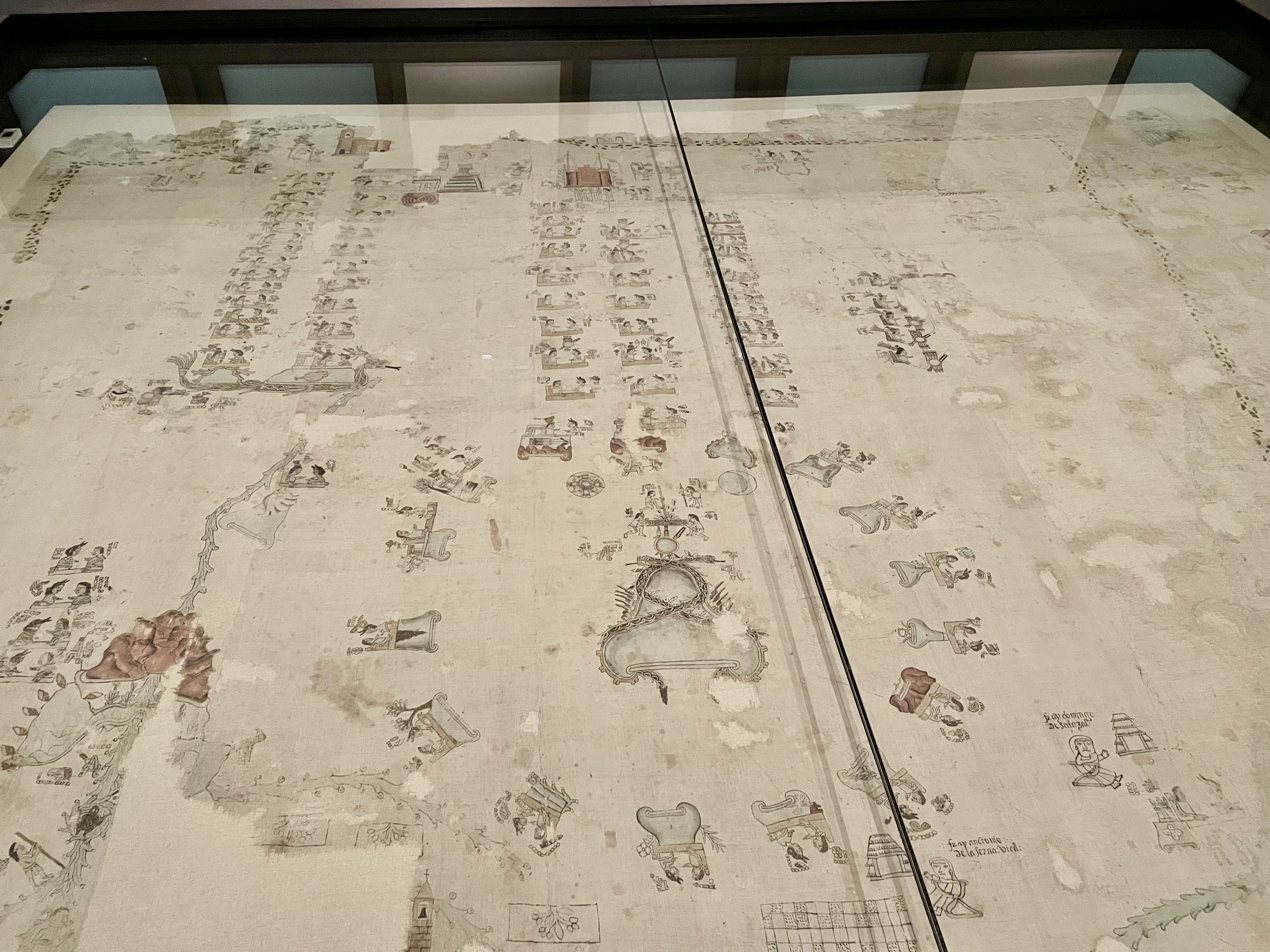
The Lienzo Seler II / Coixtlahuaca II exhibited in a special showcase at the Humboldt Forum.

Lienzo Seler II (also known as Coixtlahuaca II) is a 16th-century indigenous pictorial manuscript from the northern part of the Mixteca Alta region of Oaxaca, Mexico. Painted on a large sheet of woven cotton measuring approximately 383 × 442 cm, the lienzo represents one of the most complex colonial-period pictorial documents from the region of Coixtlahuaca and one of the most significant indigenous cartographic-historical sources from Mesoamerica.

The lienzo is a "transitional document", as it features depictions mainly in the pre-Columbian style, supplemented by inscriptions in the indigenous languages Mixtec, Chocho, and Nahuatl in Latin script. The document blends Mixtec and Chocholtec pictographic traditions with post-conquest elements and records genealogical, territorial, and ceremonial narratives. The document covers a broad historical scope. Early sequences relate to mythical or pre-Hispanic events, possibly extending back to the 12th century. Other scenes include intercommunity conflict, dynastic marriages, and ritual offerings. The latest identifiable dates refer to events around 1556, yet stylistic and material evidence—including pigment composition, drawing technique, as well as the depiction of European churches and priests—confirms that updates and annotations continued later.

The lienzo was brought to Berlin by Eduard Seler in 1897. In her 1900 publication Auf alten Wegen in Mexiko und Guatemala, Seler-Sachs vaguely mentions: “Due to a fortunate coincidence we were able to acquire such a painted linen cloth measuring 4 m in the square, which comes from the village of Coaixtlahuaca.” It is currently held by the Ethnologisches Museum . Since 2022 it is exhibited at the Humboldt Forum Berlin.

== Description ==
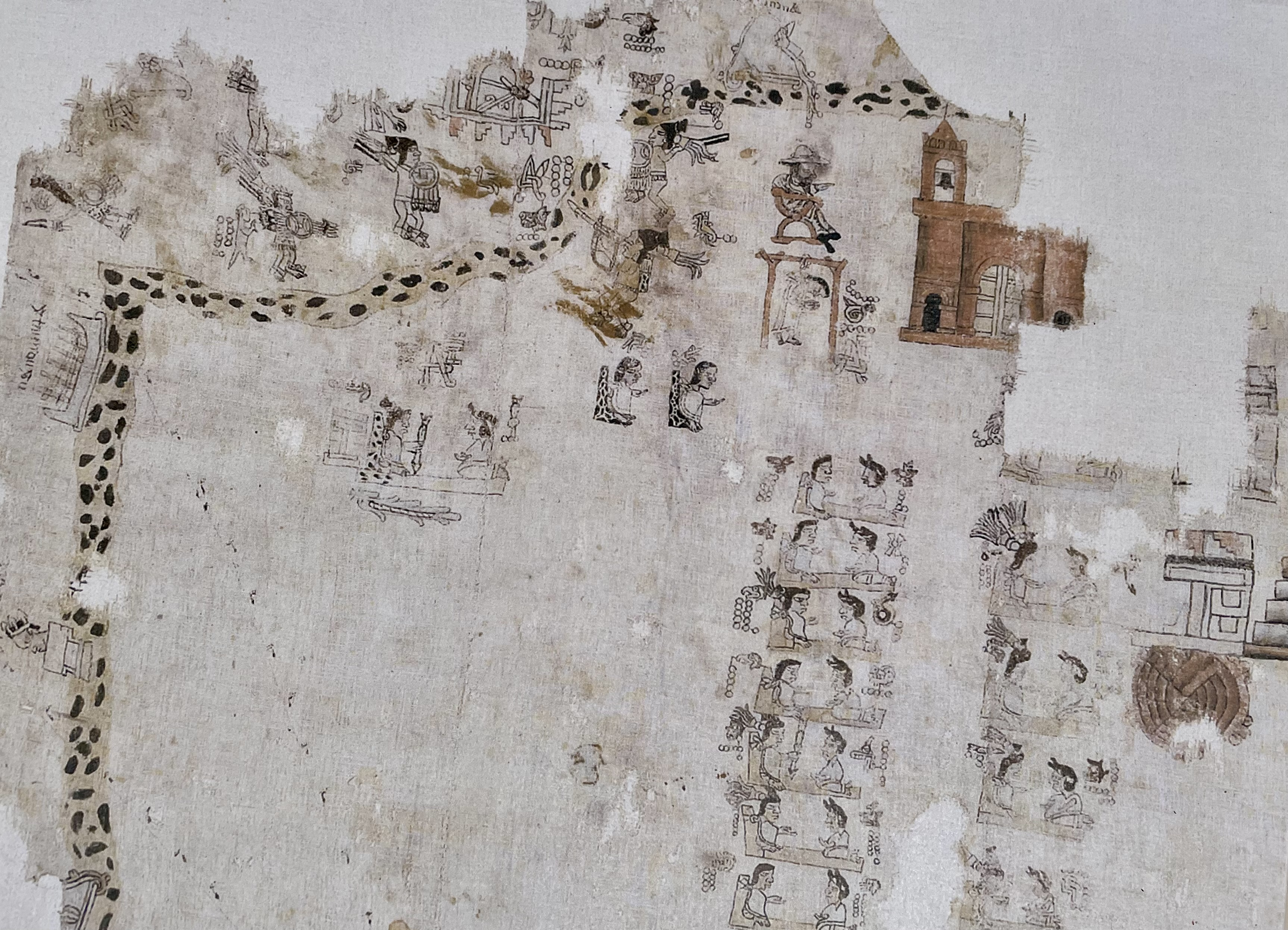
Detail of the Lienzo Seler II / Coixtlahuaca II at the top left corner showing the fighting of Aztec warriors, a Spanish judge and a hanged indigenous person, probably a Mixtec.

The lienzo is painted on a single, seamless cotton cloth using natural pigments and colored outlines. It includes depictions of settlements, dynastic lineages, and founding events, accompanied by place glyphs, footprints, and scenes of ritual and political significance. Later additions — including images of Spaniards and Christian churches — suggest that the document was updated or reused after the Spanish conquest.

The structure is spatially organized along relational axes rather than following a linear chronology. Geographic logic intertwines with social hierarchies and ceremonial priorities. The spatial arrangement of figures follows indigenous principles of historical representation. The lienzo appears to function as both a territorial map and a narrative of legitimacy. Lienzo Seler II likely served multiple purposes: preserving origin traditions, affirming local rulership, and supporting land claims during the early colonial period. It is considered part of a broader tradition of visual record-keeping among indigenous communities in the Mixteca Alta.

Lienzo Seler II belongs to a wider group of pictorial manuscripts from Coixtlahuaca and neighboring areas, and it is the most complete. While it shares thematic content with the Lienzo de Coixtlahuaca I, Lienzo de Tlapiltepec, and other Mixtec codices, its compositional logic, size, and continued adaptation make it a singular case.

== The Coixtlahuaca Group ==
The lienzo belongs to a group of pictorial documents known as the 'Coixtlahuaca Group'. These share common materials (cotton), narrative structures, and symbolic systems. The group includes:

=== Lienzos ===
- Lienzo de Coixtlahuaca I or Ixtlán
- Lienzo Seler II or Lienzo II de Coixtlahuaca
- Lienzo Meixueiro or Coixtlahuaca III or Lienzo A or Lienzo de Petlaltzinco
- Lienzos de Tequixtepec I y II
- Lienzo de Tlapiltepec or Lienzo Antonio (de León de Papalutla y Miltepec) or Códice Rickards or Lienzo de Chicomostoc
- Lienzo de Ihuitlán
- Lienzo de Nativitas
- Lienzo de Tulancingo
- Lienzo de Otla
- Lienzo de Aztatla

=== Other documents ===
- Rollo Selden on amate paper
- Fragmento Gómez de Orozco on deerskin
- Códice Baranda or Códice Alvarado on deerskin

== Research ==
Eduard Seler personally brought the Lienzo to Berlin in 1897. Walter Lehmann published Seler’s information in a short paragraph in 1905, but it was not until 70 years later that Viola König presented the first in-depth study at the XLII Americanist Congress in Paris in 1976. Her analysis appeared in the Baessler-Archive in 1984, including a complete deciphering of the Lienzo. Shortly before, Ross Parmenter had also discussed the Lienzo Seler II in his publication on four Lienzos from the Coixtlahuaca Valley. In the following years, a series of studies on the Coixtlahuaca group of manuscripts were published. The major interdisciplinary study, edited in 2017 by Viola König, was the result of a multi-year research project as part of the Exzellenzcluster Topoi (TOPOI Cluster of Excellence) at Freie Universität Berlin (2013–2017). “On The Mount of Intertwined Serpents” reflects the current international state of research by 10 authors such as Elizabeth Boone, John Pohl and others. In the final chapter, König reconstructs a 52-page pre-Hispanic codex from the entries of Lienzo Seler, which follows the basic structure of the pre-Hispanic Mixtec Codex Vindobonensis.

Researchers have been working with communities in the Coixtlahuaca region for decades. In 2013, the Ethnologisches Museum and the Freie Universität Berlin began such a collaboration as part of a better understanding of the Lienzo Seler II to exchange knowledge about the lienzo and its meanings. Moreover, archaeological excavations were carried out in the Coixtlahuaca Valley.

== Provenance and legal status ==
According to museum records, Eduard Seler purchased the Lienzo in 1897 during a research trip to Mexico for the Königliches Museum für Völkerkunde in Berlin. However, the exact circumstances of its acquisition from the former owner, Manuel Martínez Gracida —a known collector of indigenous documents during the Porfirian period—remain open to scrutiny.

The document’s removal from the community has raised concerns. Its ownership is contested unless it can be proven that the lienzo left Coixtlahuaca with the authorization of its communal authorities. The Stiftung Preußischer Kulturbesitz Berlin is currently refusing restitution because there was no request at national government level. Instead, a photo print on textile was produced for the municipality of Coixtlahuaca. However, the mayor of San Juan Bautista Coixtlahuaca, Horacio Miguel Cruz, expressed the expectation that the Lienzo would one day return to its place of origin.

The Lienzo Seler II is on display on the second floor of the Humboldt Forum. Due to its sensitivity to light, it is shown at intervals in a specially designed exhibition case.
