= Lady K'awiil Yopaat =

8th century Maya queen

Lady K'awiil Yopaat (died 774) was the queen regnant of the Maya city of Toniná between 762 and 774.

She was the daughter of king K’inich Tuun Chapat.

She succeeded to the throne after her father's death 762. She was the monarch when Toniná defeated the rival city state of Palenque in war in 764.

She died in 774. She was succeeded on the throne by her son, king K'inich Chapat.
