= San Juan Bautista Coixtlahuaca =

- Municipality and town
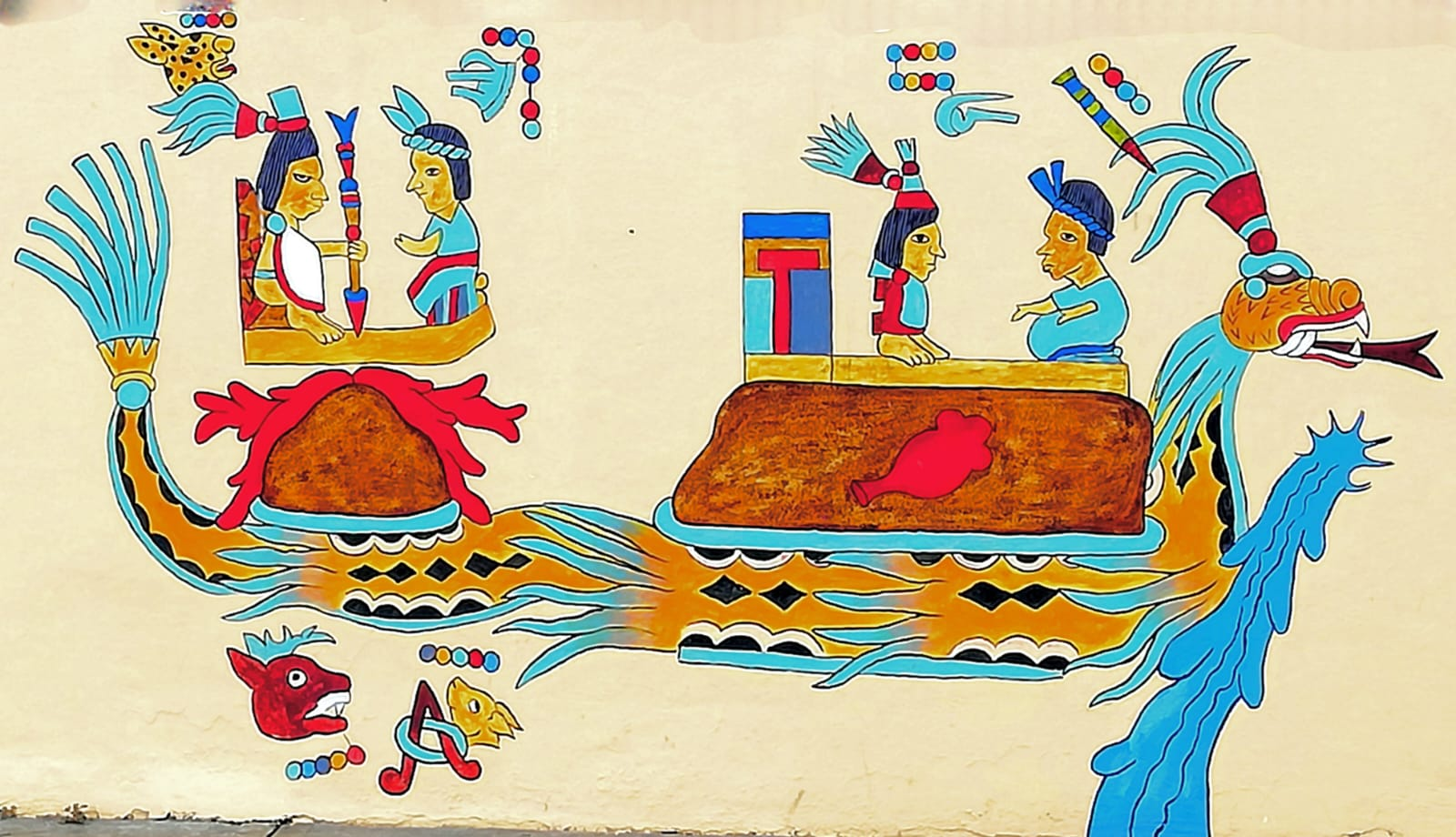
- Coat of arms

- Location in Mexico
- Coordinates: 17°43′N 97°19′W
- Country: Mexico
- State: Oaxaca

Area
  - Total: 17.26 km^{2} (6.66 sq mi)

Population (2005)
  - Total: 2,863
- Time zone: UTC-6 (Central Standard Time)

San Juan Bautista Coixtlahuaca is a small town and municipality located in the Mixteca Region of the State of Oaxaca, Mexico, and the center of the Coixtlahuaca district. The name "Coixtlahuaca" means 'plain of snakes' in the Nahuatl language. One of the most significant indigenous pictorial manuscripts from the region is the Lienzo Seler Coixtlahuaca II.

== Town ==
The town was founded by the Chocholtecs in 37 AD. Their last emperor was Atonaltzin, who fought against the Mexicas. He was defeated twice, the second by Moctezuma II, who conquered much of the area.

It is located in the northeast part of the state of Oaxaca, 2,100 meters above sea level near the Cuacnopalan-Oaxaca highway. It contains the Iglesia de San Juan Bautista (Church of Saint John the Baptist), completed in 1576. The church is of Renaissance style with rose windows, sculptures, and a main entrance with dozens of recesses. It also has a Baroque-style altarpiece (retablo).

== Municipality ==
As municipal seat, San Juan Bautista Coixtlahuaca has governing jurisdiction over the following communities:

- Barrio de Magdalena
- Boca de Perro
- Carrizal
- Cerro de Agua (Tercera Sección)
- Cerro el Águila
- Cuesta Blanca
- El Cachuche
- El Capulín (Sección Primera)
- El Guajolote
- El Portezuelo
- El Sotol
- El Tepozán (Sección Segunda)
- El Zapato
- El Zapotal (Sección Tercera)
- Estancia
- Ixcate
- Jazmín Río Poblano
- La Ciénega
- La Cruz
- La Mulata
- Laguna Seca
- Narrege
- Río Blanco
- Río Poblano
- San Jerónimo Otla
- Santa Catarina Ocotlán
- Sección Cuarta (Los Rodríguez)
- Tecamachalco
- Tronco del Río
- Zacate Amarillo

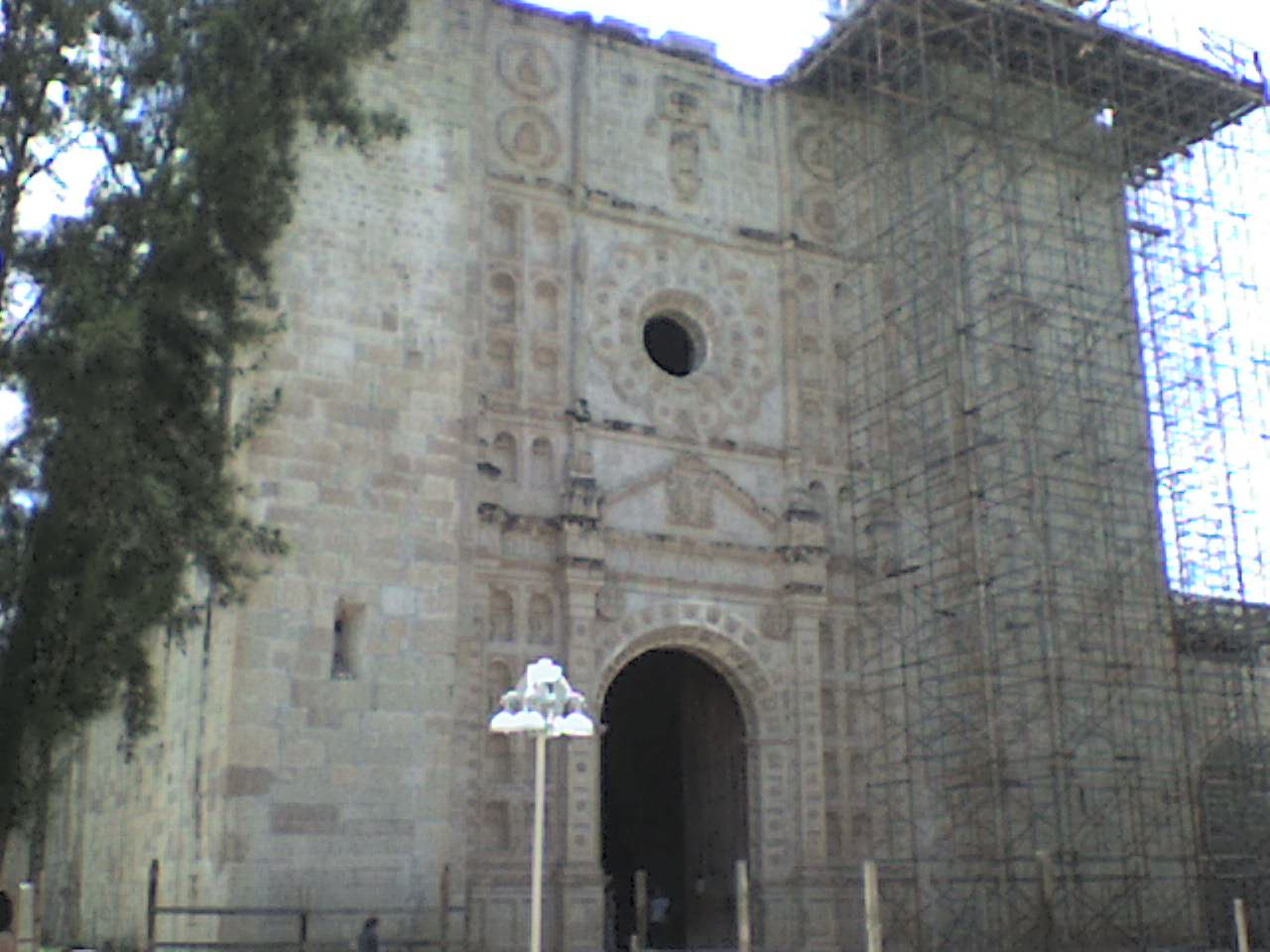
Church and Former Convento of San Juan Bautista, Coixtlahuaca
