= Walter Lehmann (ethnologist) =

German ethnologist, linguist and archeologist

Walter Hartmut Traugott Erdmann Lehmann (16 September 1878 – 7 February 1939) was a German ethnologist, linguist and archeologist, known for his documentation of many indigenous cultures and languages of Central America. He studied under Eduard Seler, a renowned specialist in Mesoamerican cultures. Between 1907 and 1909 he undertook an expedition traveling from Panama to Mexico, in which he collected artefacts and ethnographic and linguistic data. He collected the only known documentation of several indigenous languages of Central America before they became extinct. His 1915 habilitation thesis was a vocabulary of the Rama language, and an historical analysis of the Subtiaba language. In 1921 he became director of the Ethnological Museum of Berlin.

== Selected publications ==
- Lehmann, Walter (1911), Zentral-Amerika (I), Berlin: D. Reimer.
- Lehmann, Walter (1914), Vokabular der Rama-Sprache nebst grammatischem Abriss, München: Akademische Buchdruckerei von F. Straub.
