= Ātōnaltzin =

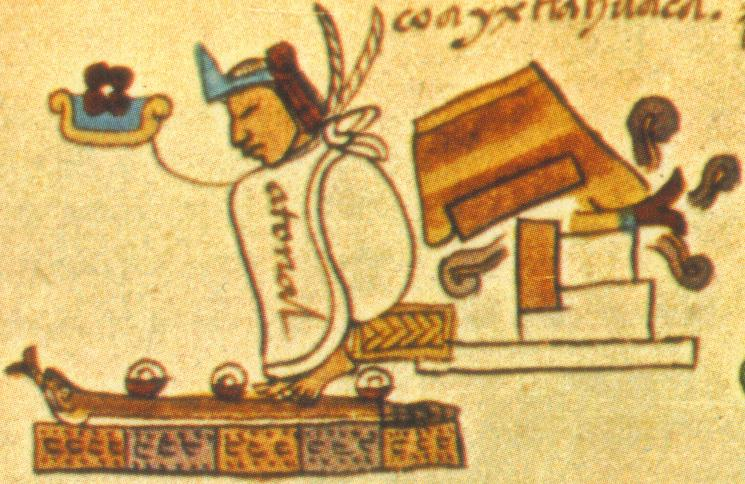
Atonal's death and the conquest of Coixtlahuaca, in the Aztec Codex Mendoza.

Atonaltzin (Nahuatl name), also referred to as Atonal II (Nahuatl reverential form) or Dzawindanda (Mixtec name), was a 15th-century ruler of the Mixtec kingdom of Coixtlahuaca.

Atonal was executed after Coixtlahuaca was conquered by the Aztecs under Moctezuma I, ostensibly to avenge the deaths of 160 pochteca. Different sources give the year in which this occurred as 1453, 1458, 1461 or 1468.
