= Matacapan =

Archaeological site in Mexico

Coordinates: 18°30′N 95°14′W

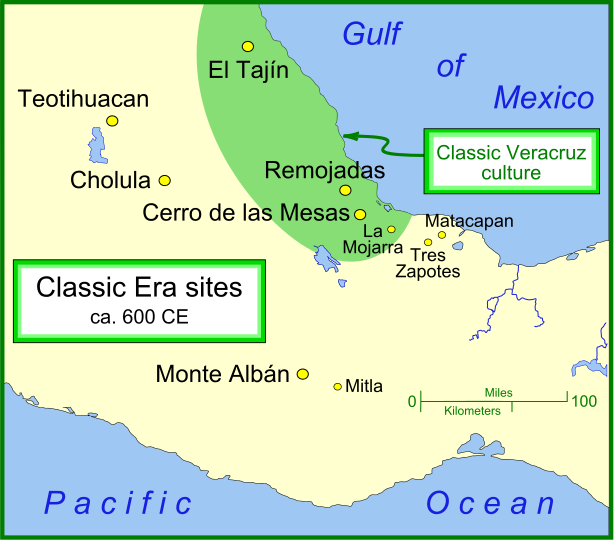
Matacapan and other important Classic Era settlements.

Matacapan or Matacapan Piedra is a pre-Hispanic settlement from the Classic era archaeological site in the present-day Mexican state of Veracruz situated in the Sierra de Los Tuxtlas, near Catemaco. The site is important both for its ancient occupation and for its place within the Tuxtlas landscape, one of Veracruz's most distinctive cultural and environmental regions.

In 1989, researchers described evidence for specialized ceramics production at Matacapan. Only a limited number of ceramic wares and vessel forms were produced at the site, and they were then traded over comparatively long distances, implying the use of water transport for distribution.

The 1992 book Gardens of Prehistory: The Archaeology of Settlement Agriculture in Greater Mesoamerica contained two papers on the Matacapan site. Thomas W. Killion described the relationship between residential and agricultural areas at Matacapan. Robert S. Santley described the settlement pattern, land use, and refuse disposal at the site.

In 1994, Santley described the economy of Matacapan varying with time: "the Early Classic regional system was small scale and organized most likely as a bounded hierarchical economy. In contrast, a dendritic political economy developed in Middle Classic times, in which the production of ceramics and/or their contents for distribution beyond the local region was emphasized. The Late Classic system was smaller scale, with most production destined for local clienteles, but apparently it was more commercialized, resembling an interlocking central-place system in several respects." Santley's proposed dendritic political economy was challenged in some respects in a 2008 paper.

The final report (1994) of the Matacapan Archaelogical Project concluded: "[The] evidence is consistent with the proposition that the Teotihuacan barrio [in Matacapan] was built for and occupied by foreigners from Teotihuacan. Those foreigners appear to have maintained Teotihuacan religious and cooking habits, but otherwise they seem to have adopted local customs, as reflected by the predominance of local technology and residential architecture." Matacapan was part of the Teotihuacán trade network.

A wealth of knowledge has been gleaned from the ceramic artifacts that the civilization at Matacapan left behind; Ortiz and Santley's work offered a window into the lives and livelihoods of the founders of Matacapan and their descendants.
