= Caecilie Seler-Sachs =

German ethnologist, photographer and author (1855-1935)

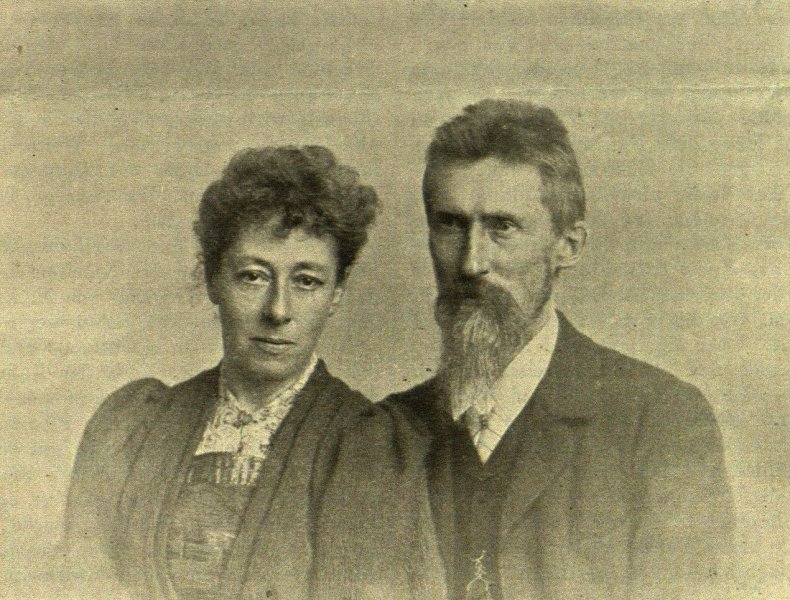
Caecilie Seler-Sachs and Eduard Seler in 1897

Caecilie Seler-Sachs (1 June 1855 – 4 January 1935) was a German ethnologist, photographer and author. She did research on topics in Mesoamerican history and published several books, among them one on Women's lives among the Aztecs. She was married to Eduard Seler the philologist, historian and specialist in Mesoamerican indigenous cultures, and she supplied photographs for most of his publications, and her inherited fortune supported both of their research. Furthermore, she and her husband traveled through Mexico and Central America doing archeological excavations and ethnological studies. After her husband's death, she edited and published his collected works.

She was born in Berlin to a wealthy family, her father a doctor. She received a good education, although being a woman she was not allowed to take professional titles. In 1884, she married Eduard Seler, who she had met because he was a patient in her father's medical practice. The two undertook six travels to the Americas: 1887–88 to the US and Mexico, 1895–1897 to Mexico and Guatemala, 1902–03 to the US and Mexico, 1904–05 to Oaxaca, Mexico, 1906–07 to Mexico, the US and Canada and 1910–11 to Mexico, Argentina, Bolivia, Peru and Panama. When her husband was immobilized by illness during their travels, she and a Native guide ventured alone into the jungle on horseback, where she looked for ruins and made drawings of architecture and iconography. Nonetheless, her primary interest was in ethnology, the study of the forms of life of contemporary indigenous peoples. Viola König has discussed Caecilie Seler-Sachs as an early example of an overlooked female collector and ethnographer in colonial Mesoamerica. In her 1900 publication Auf alten Wegen in Mexiko und Guatemala, Seler-Sachs provided detailed ethnographic observations from her travels with Eduard Seler in 1895–1897.

In her 1900 publication Auf alten Wegen in Mexiko und Guatemala, Seler-Sachs provided detailed ethnographic observations from her travels with Eduard Seler in 1895–1897. In the same account, she vaguely mentions: “Due to a fortunate coincidence we were able to acquire such a painted linen cloth measuring 4 m in the square, which comes from the village of Coaixtlahuaca.” (Lienzo Seler Coixtlahuaca II)

In 1919, she published the book "Frauenleben im Reiche der Azteken. Ein Blatt aus der Kulturgeschichte Altmexikos" (Women's lives in the realm of the Aztecs. An aspect of ancient Mexican cultural history) in which she describes the lives of women in Aztec period Mexico.
