= Coixtlahuaca =

Pre-Columbian Mesoamerican state in the Mixteca Alta

Coixtlahuaca Nguichee Yodzocoo Coaixtlahuacan
- 1080–1490
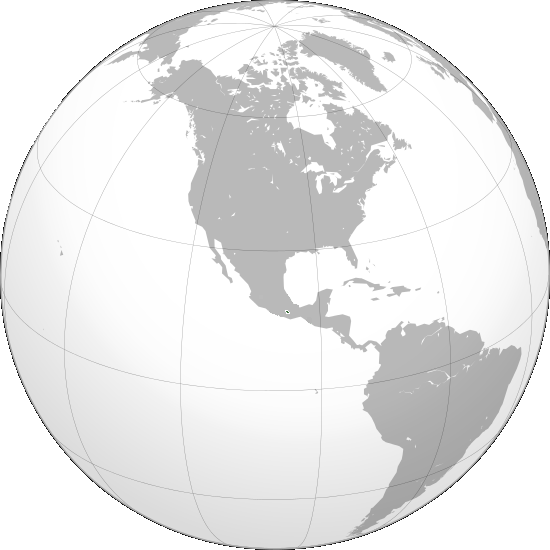
- Capital: Coixtlahuaca
- Common languages: Chocho; Mixtec; Nahuatl
- Religion: Mesoamerican
- Government: Monarchy
- History
  - Established: 1080
  - Incorporated into the Mexica: 1490
Succeeded by
Aztec Empire

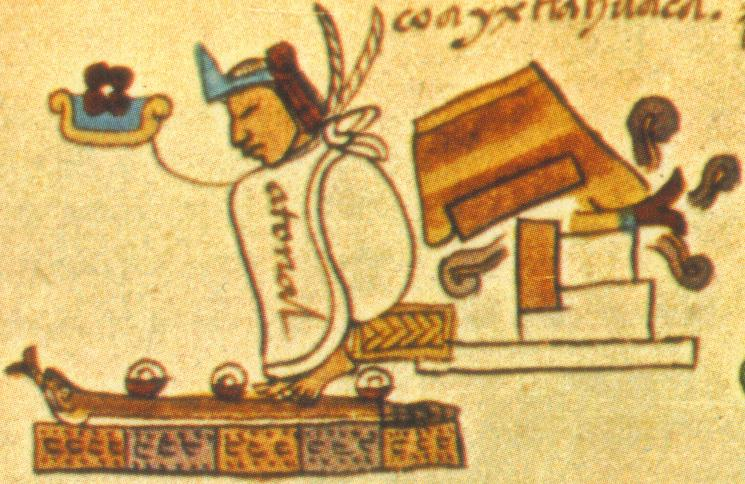
Atonal's death and the conquest of Coixtlahuaca, in the Aztec Codex Mendoza.

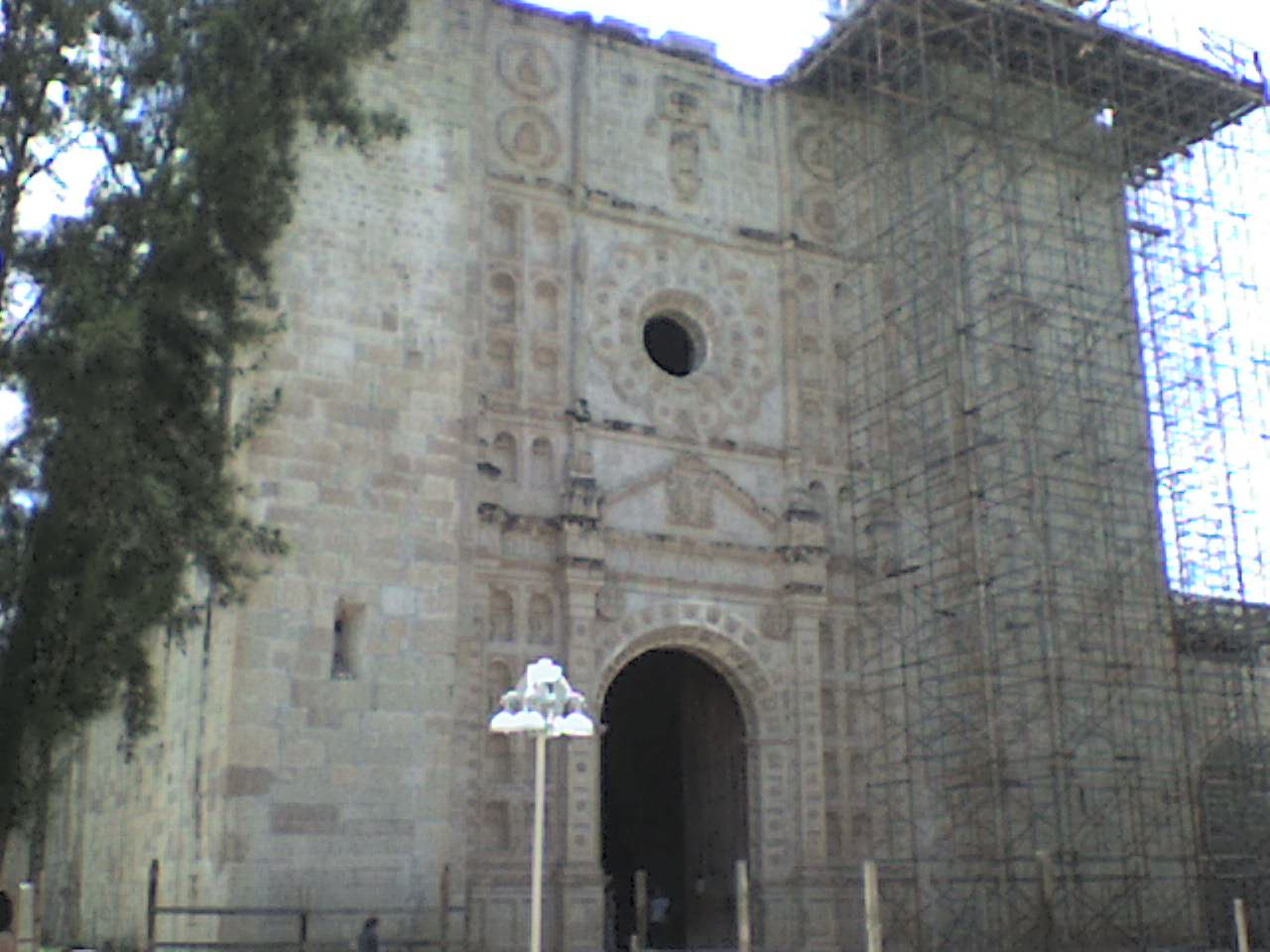
Dominican Convent in San Juan Bautista Coixtlahuaca, Oaxaca

Coixtlahuaca (Chocho: Nguichee; Mixtec: Yodzocoo; Nahuatl: Coaixtlahuacan) was a pre-Columbian Mesoamerican state in the Mixteca Alta (now San Juan Bautista Coixtlahuaca in the Mexican state of Oaxaca). Coixtlahuaca was a multi-ethnic polity, inhabited by both Chochos and Mixtecs and also exerting power over the Cuicatecs. In addition to the Chocho and Mixtec languages, Nahuatl was used as a lingua franca. Its name means "plain of snakes".

Coixtlahuaca had a large market and had trade ties to several altepeme in the Valley of Mexico, Cholula, the Oaxaca Valley, the rest of the Mixteca Alta, and the Pacific coast. Merchants from these regions imported goods like gold, feathers, cacao, artisan gourds, clothing, cochineal and dyed rabbit fur. In the mid-15th century, Ātōnaltzin, the ruler of Coixtlahuaca, ordered the Central Mexican merchants resident in the town executed and their merchandise seized, in a major violation of Mesoamerican norms of international commerce. This triggered a Mexica conquest under Moctezuma I, and Ātōnaltzin was subsequently executed. Thereafter, it became the capital of a tributary province that covered the entire Nochixtlan valley as well as what is now the Cuicatlán District. The Mexica decision to grant it jurisdiction over the Mixtec towns to the south may have been part of a strategy to counter their political power. Coixtlahuaca was home to an Mexica garrison and governor, and paid tribute of decorated clothing, warrior costumes, shields, greenstone strings, quetzal feathers, cochineal, gold dust, and a feathered headpiece. Early tribute consisted of mantas, chili, cotton, sea salt, dyes, and possibly gourd bowls.

According to Hernán Cortés, envoys of Coixtlahuaca surrendered to the Spaniards in September 1520. Coixtlahuaca was incorporated into New Spain as the municipality of San Juan Bautista Coixtlahuaca.

== See also ==
- Atonal II
