= Eduard Seler =

German anthropologist (1849–1922)

Eduard G. Seler
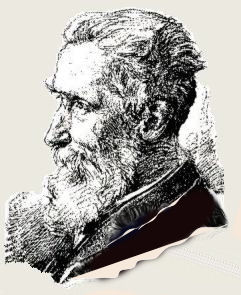
- Eduard Georg Seler
- Born: December 5, 1849; Crossen an der Oder, Prussia
- Died: November 23, 1922 (aged 72)
- Occupations: Anthropologist, ethnohistorian, linguist, epigrapher

Eduard Georg Seler (December 5, 1849 – November 23, 1922) was a prominent German anthropologist, ethnohistorian, linguist, epigrapher, academic and Americanist scholar, who made extensive contributions in these fields towards the study of pre-Columbian era cultures in the Americas.

== Research ==
Seler is best known for his foundational studies concerning the ethnography, documents, and history of Mesoamerican cultures, for which he is regarded as one of the most influential scholars active around the turn of the 20th century. Seler laid many fundamentals in understanding and deciphering the Aztec pictorial script. A main contribution was the re-discovery and analysis of the basic Aztec calendar system: the existence of two Aztec calendars, a 365-day solar profane (everyday use) and a 260-day religious calendar. He also noted from the sources that the ceremonial killing victim figures alleged by Spanish priests and military (repeatedly reported as being greater than 10,000 or even 100,000) were most probably vastly exaggerated propaganda. This was supported by excavations in the late 20th century. Seler also brought Lienzo Seler II, an indigenous manuscript, to Berlin in 1897.

Being poor and of ailing health, he was helped and supported for decades by his wife Cäcilie (Cecilia) Seler-Sachs (1855–1935), physically and intellectually. Her photos of Aztec temples and pyramids are still useful to scientists, and after her husband's death she went about verifying his works and publishing them. Seler was also helped by a Mexican scholar and by historians Antonio Peñafiel and Manuel Martínez Gracida.

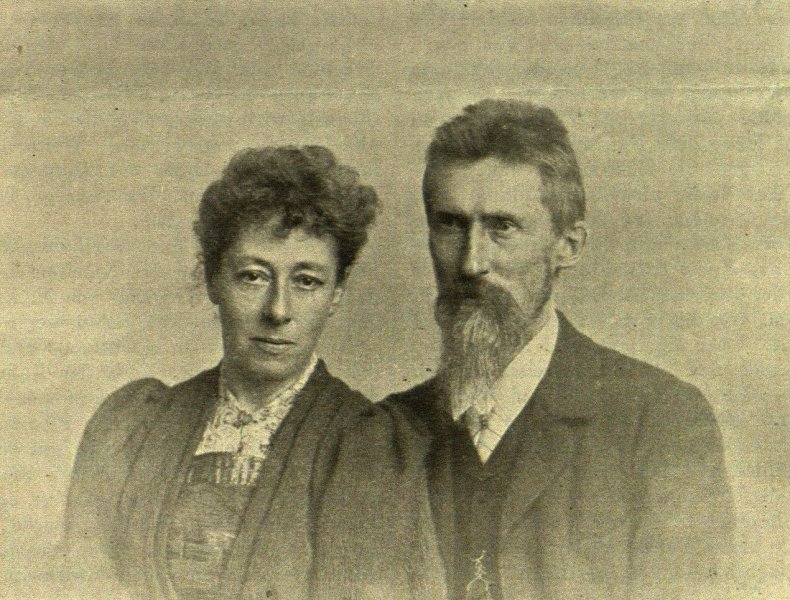
1897 portrait of Eduard Seler and his wife Caecilie Seler-Sachs

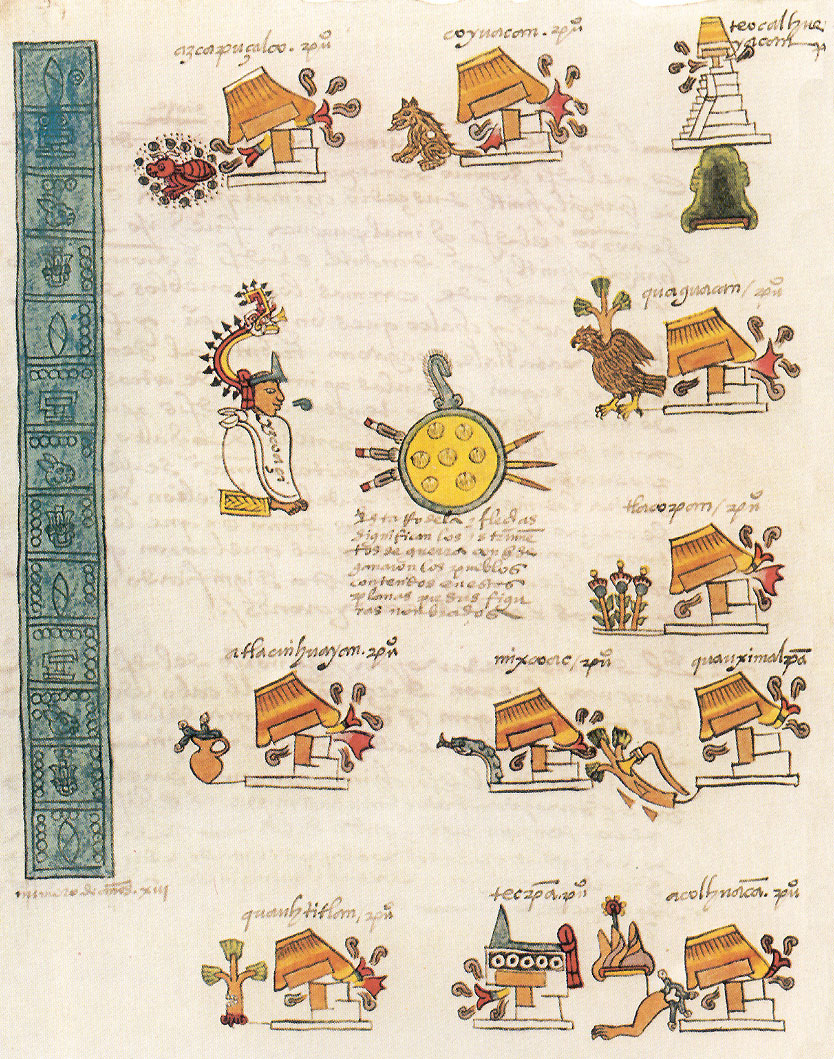
A page of the Codex Mendoza : the conquests and rules of Itzcoatl tlatoani of Tenochtitlan (1427–1440)

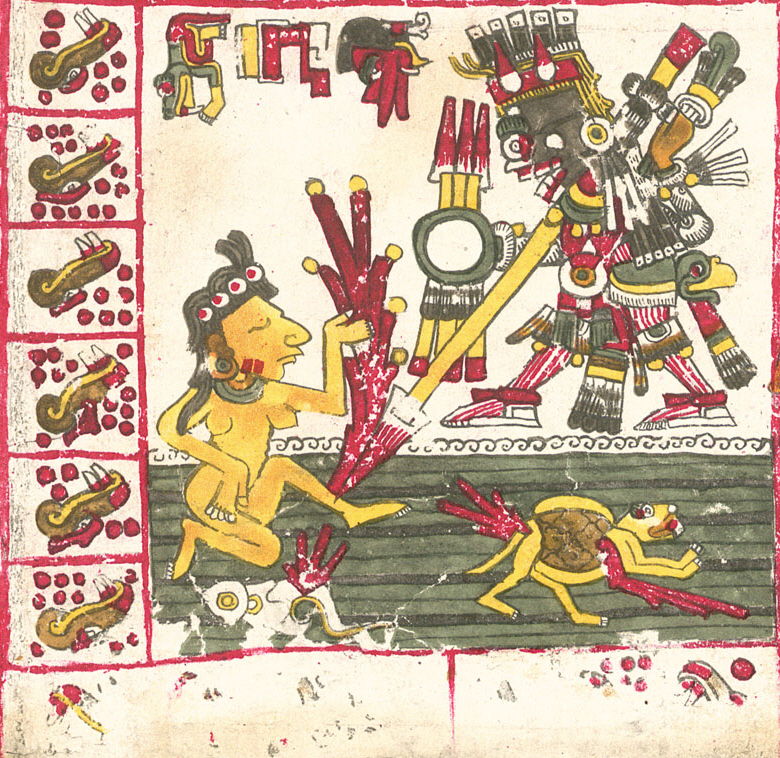
Bottom left page of the Borgia Codex (16th century): the deity Tlahuizcalpantecuhtli spearing a woman

== Timeline ==
- 1863-69 — Attendance at Joachimsthalsche Gymnasium, Berlin
- 1870-71 — Military service (during the Franco-Prussian War)
- 1871-75 — Studied at University of Berlin
- 1875-79 — Teaching science and mathematics
- 1887 — Doctoral degree from University of Leipzig
- 1895-97 — Investigation of Maya cave sites including Quen Santo
- 1904-22 — Directorship of American Division, Königliches Museum für Völkerkunde in Berlin

== Writings by Eduard Seler ==
- Gesammelte Abhandlungen zur Amerikanischen Sprach- und Alterthumskunde. 5 vols. Berlin : A. Asher, 1902-1923.
- Collected Works in Mesoamerican Linguistics and Archaeology. Culver City (CA) : Labyrinthos, 1990-1998; translated (by Charles P. Bowditch & Frank E. Comparato) into English.
