= Geography of El Salvador =

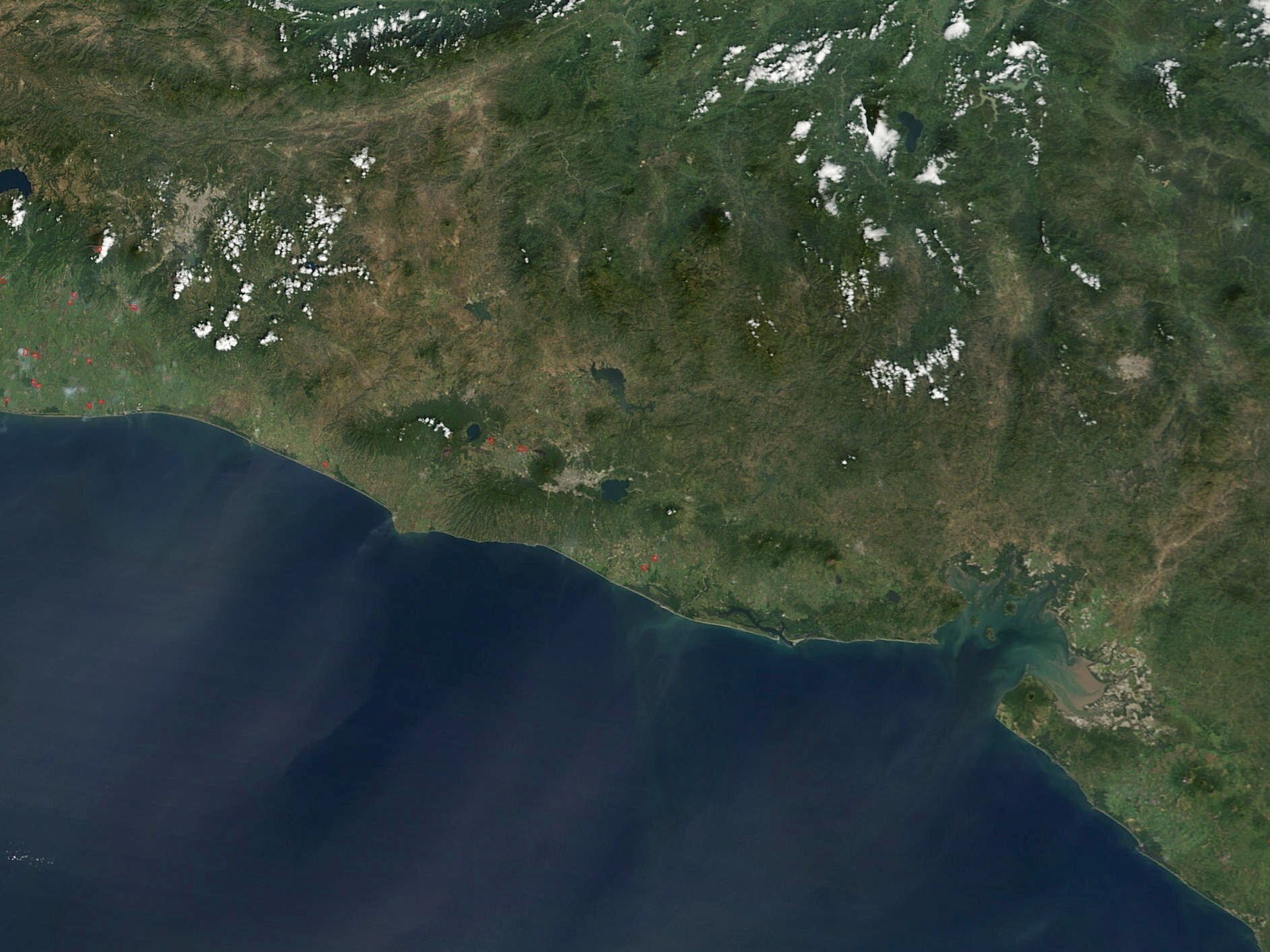
- El Salvador (satellite image)

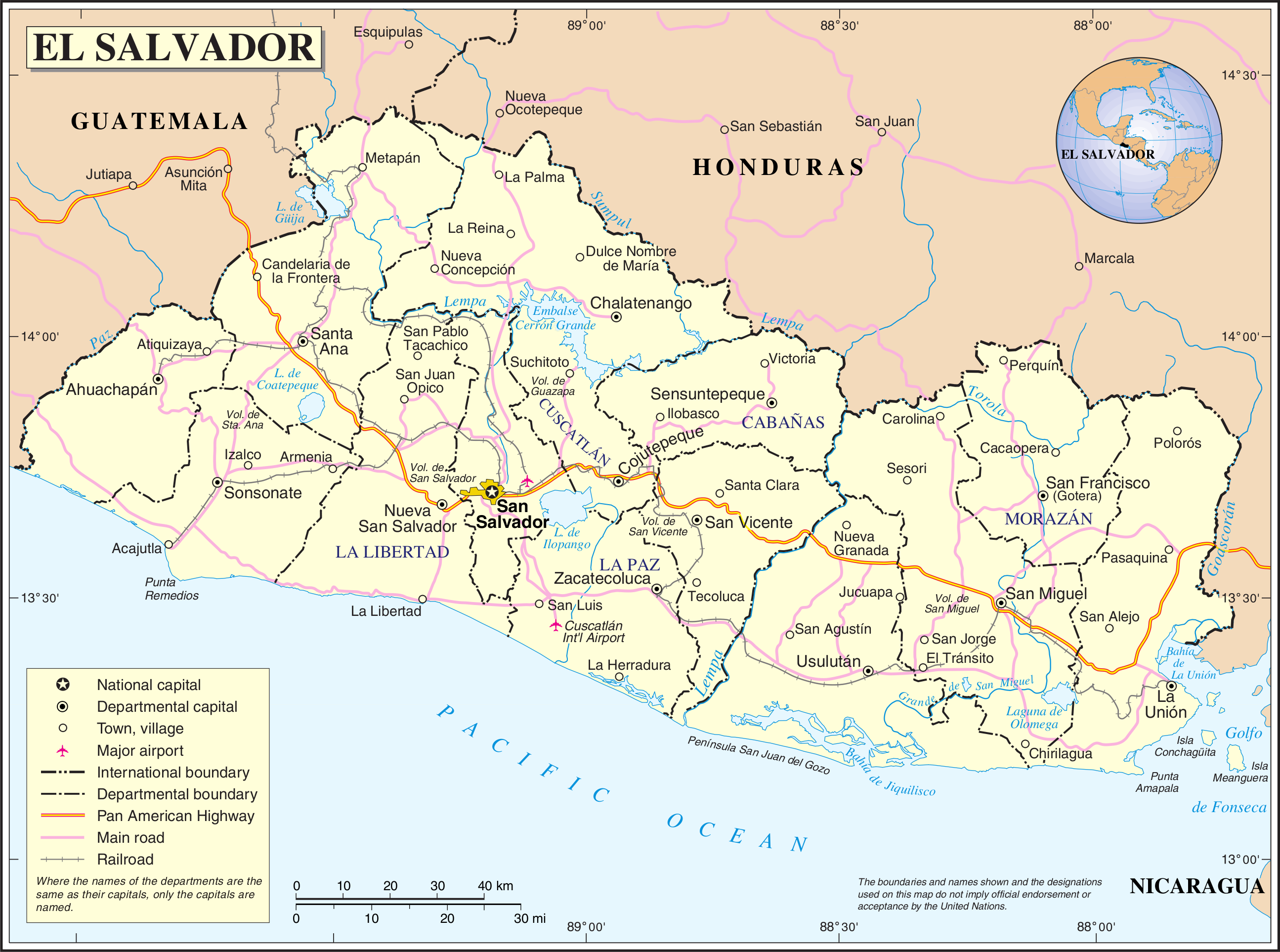
- Continent: North America
- Region: Central America
- Area: Ranked 148th
  - Total: 21,041 km^{2} (8,124 sq mi)
  - Land: 98.48%
  - Water: 1.52%
- Coastline: 307 km (191 mi)
- Borders: Total border: 590 km (370 mi)
- Highest point: Cerro El Pital; 2,730 metres (8,960 ft)
- Lowest point: Pacific Ocean; 0 metres (0 ft)
- Longest river: Río Lempa; 422 km (262 mi)
- Largest lake: Lago de Ilopango; 72 km^{2} (28 mi^{2})
- Exclusive economic zone: 90,962 km^{2} (35,121 mi^{2})

El Salvador is a country in Central America. Situated at the meeting point of three tectonic plates, it has high seismological activity and is the location of numerous earthquakes and volcanic eruptions. The country has a tropical climate.

== Plate tectonics ==
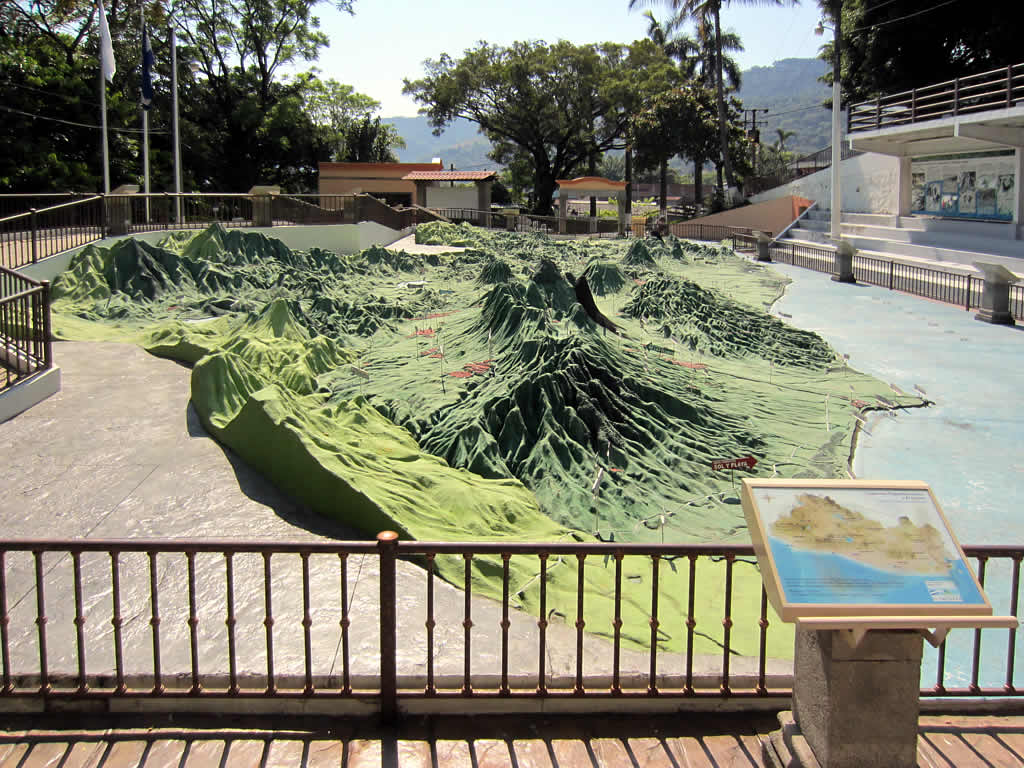
El Salvador relief map

Middle America Trench subduction zone

El Salvador, along with the rest of Central America, is one of the most seismologically active regions on earth, situated atop three of the large tectonic plates that constitute the Earth's surface. The motion of these plates causes the area's earthquake and volcanic activity.

Most of Central America and the Caribbean Basin rests on the relatively motionless Caribbean Plate. The Pacific Ocean floor, however, is being carried northeast by the underlying motion of the Cocos Plate. Ocean floor material is largely composed of basalt, which is relatively dense; when it collides with the lighter granite rocks of Central America, the ocean floor is forced down under the land mass, creating the deep Middle America Trench that lies off the coast of El Salvador.

The subduction of the Cocos Plate accounts for the frequency of earthquakes near the coast. As the rocks constituting the ocean floor are forced down, they melt, and the molten material pours up through weaknesses in the surface rock, producing volcanoes and geysers.

North of El Salvador, Mexico and most of Guatemala are riding on the westward-moving North American Plate that butts against the northern edge of the stationary Caribbean Plate in southern Guatemala. The grinding action of these two plates creates a fault (similar to the San Andreas fault in California) that runs the length of the valley of the Río Motagua in Guatemala. Motion along this fault is the source of earthquakes in northernmost El Salvador.

El Salvador has a long history of destructive earthquakes and volcanic eruptions. San Salvador was destroyed in 1756 and 1854, and suffered heavy damage in the 1919, 1982, and 1986 tremors. The country has over twenty volcanoes, although only two, San Miguel and Izalco, have been active in recent years. From the early nineteenth century to the mid-1950s, Izalco erupted with a regularity that earned it the name "Lighthouse of the Pacific". Its brilliant flares were clearly visible for great distances at sea, and at night its glowing lava turned it into a brilliant luminous cone.

== Physical features ==
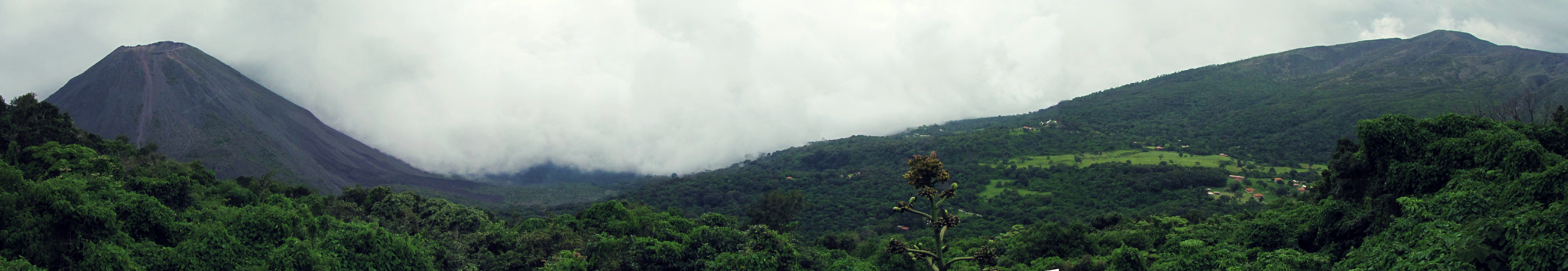
View of Izalco (volcano) and Santa Ana Volcano from Cerro Verde

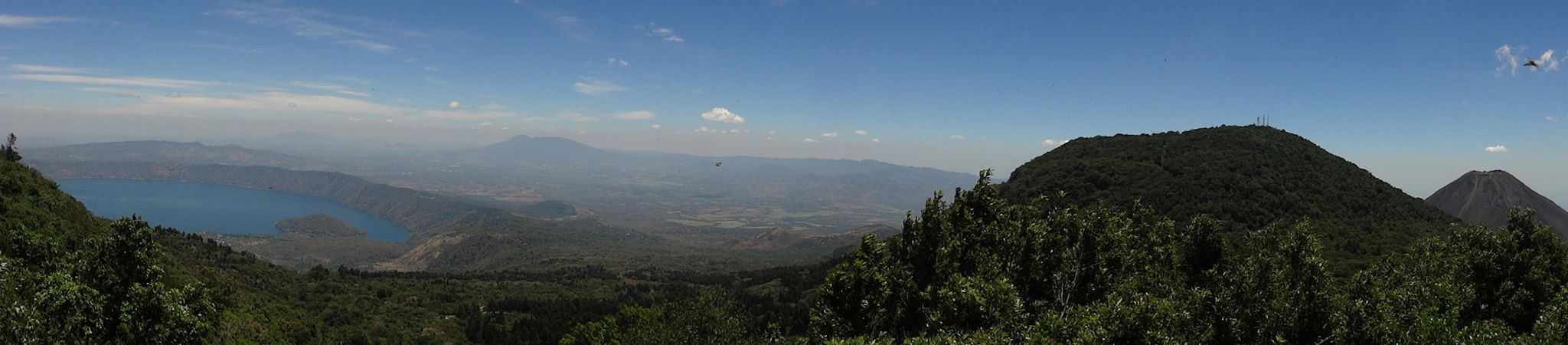
View of Cerro Verde, Izalco (volcano) and Coatepeque Caldera from Santa Ana Volcano

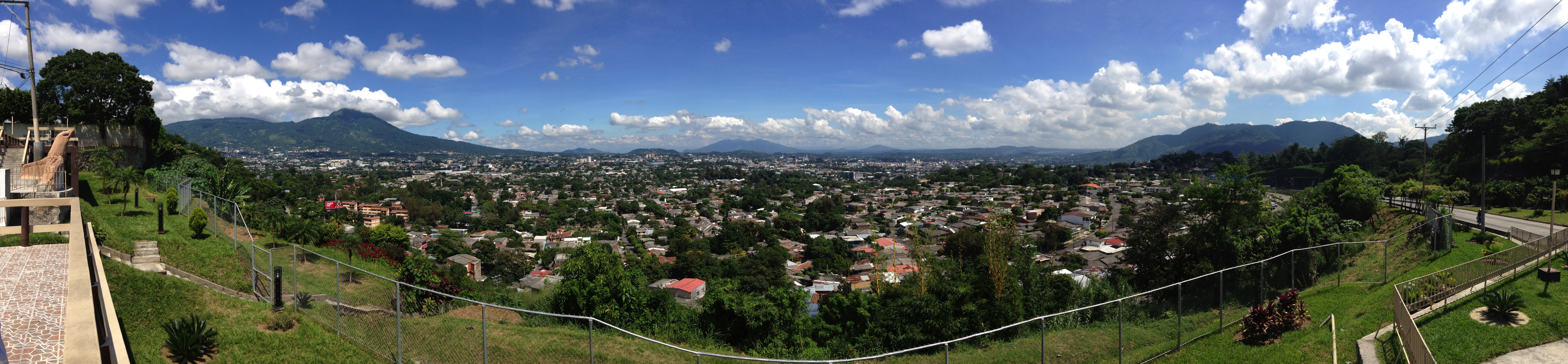
View of San Salvador city and San Salvador (volcano)

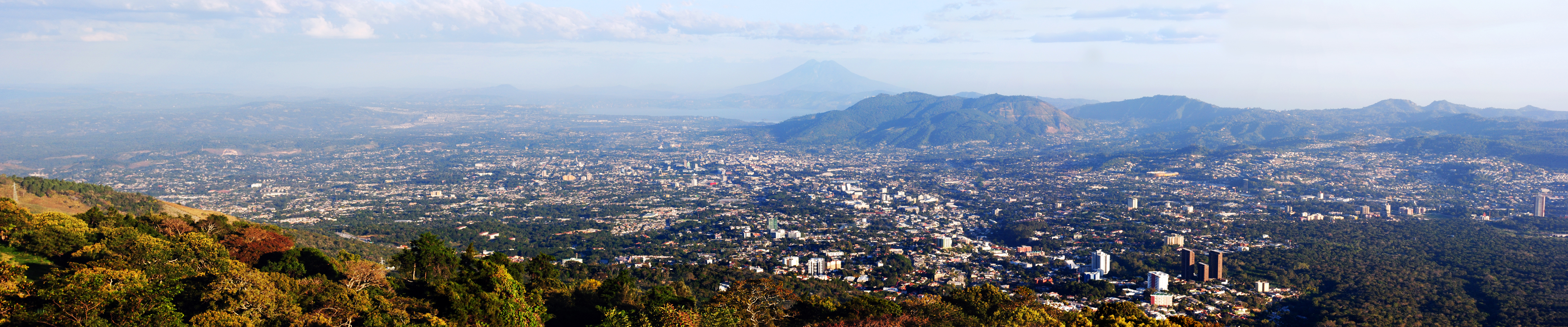
View of San Salvador city from San Salvador (volcano)

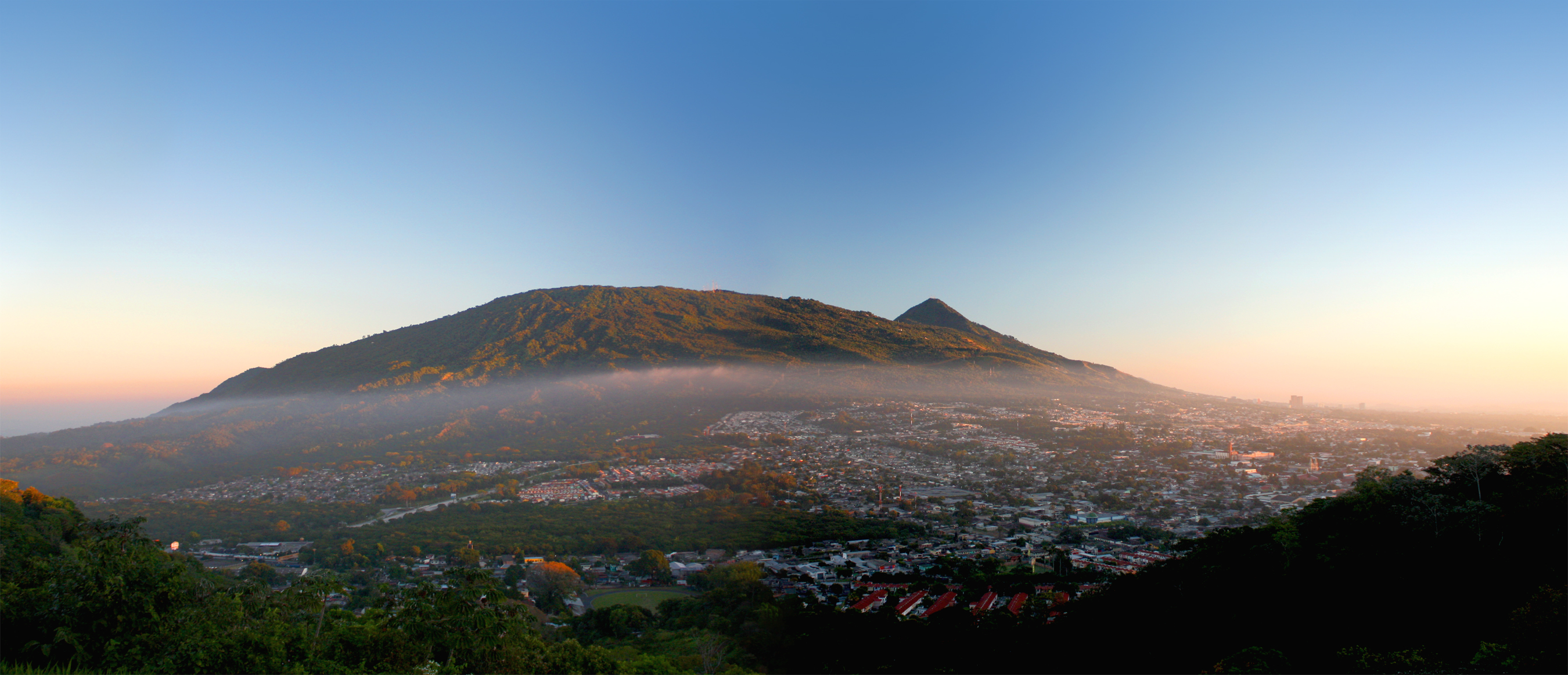
San Salvador (volcano).

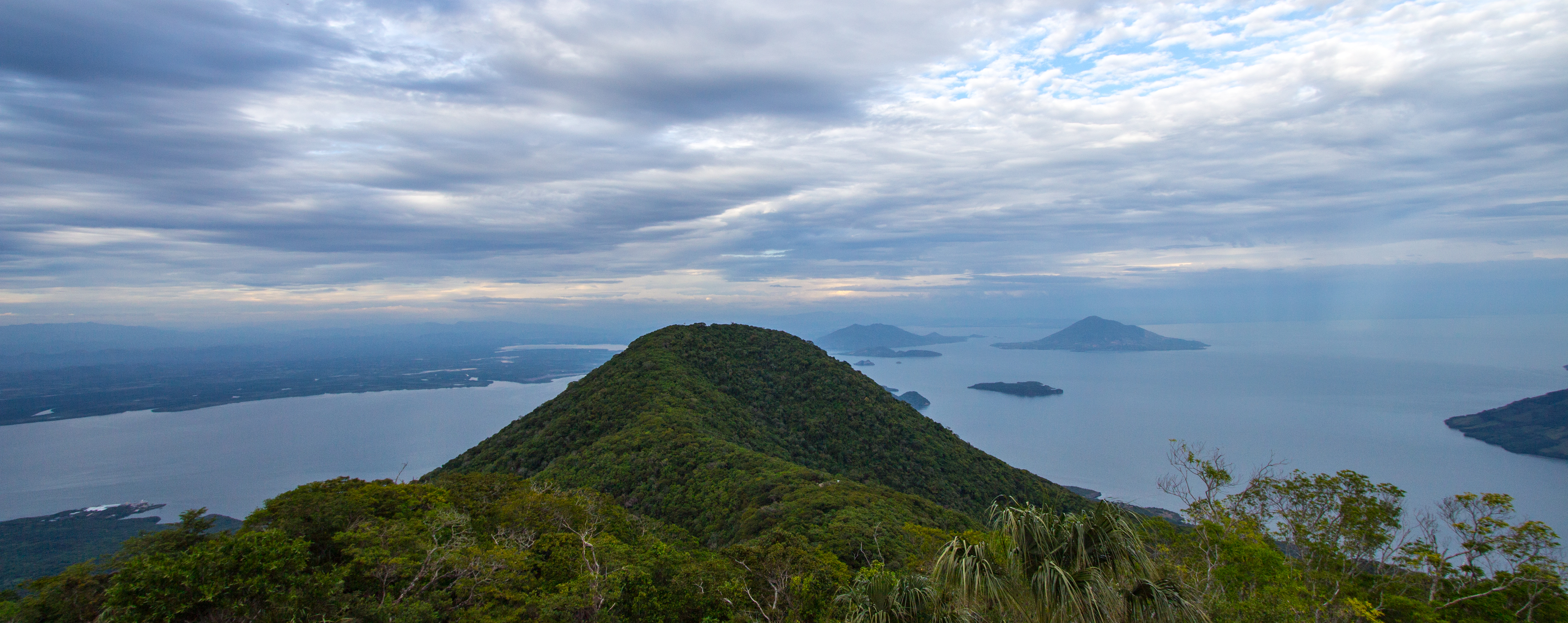
View of Gulf of Fonseca from Conchagua (volcano)

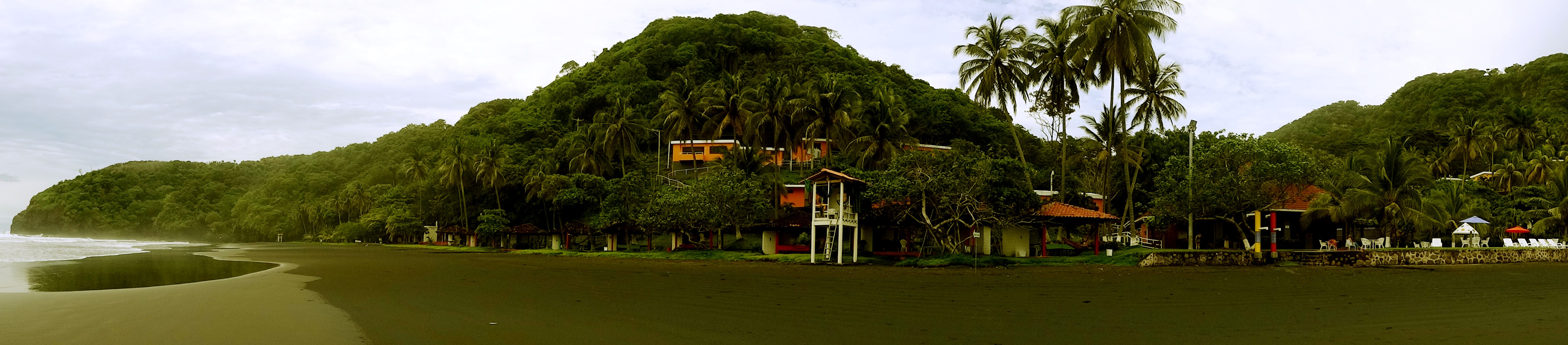
El Balsamar, La Libertad Department (El Salvador)

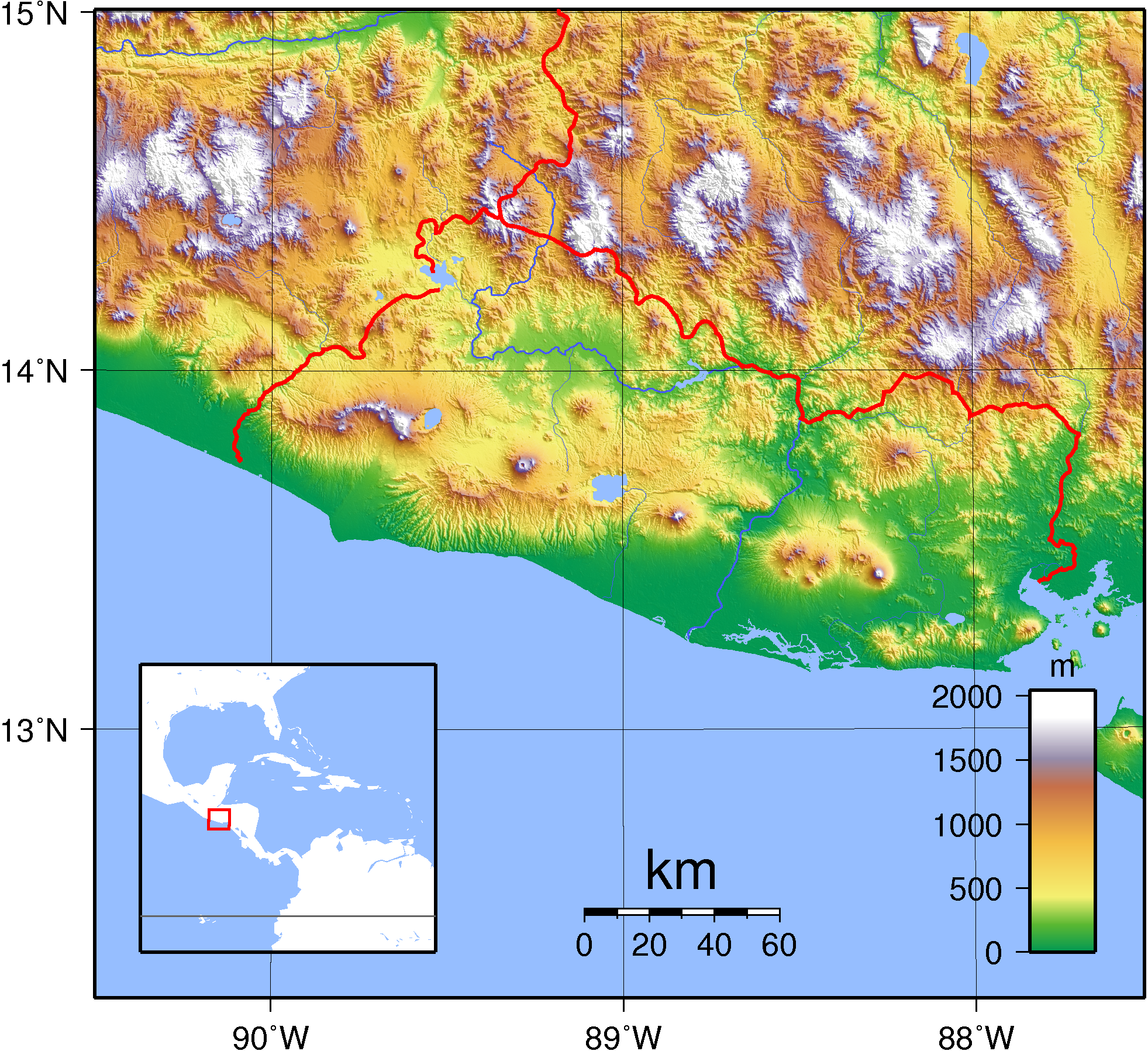
El Salvador's topography.

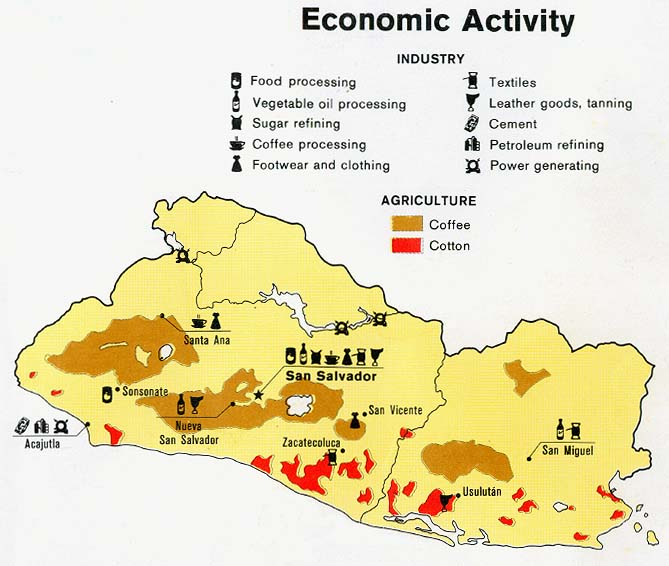
Economic activity of El Salvador, 1980.

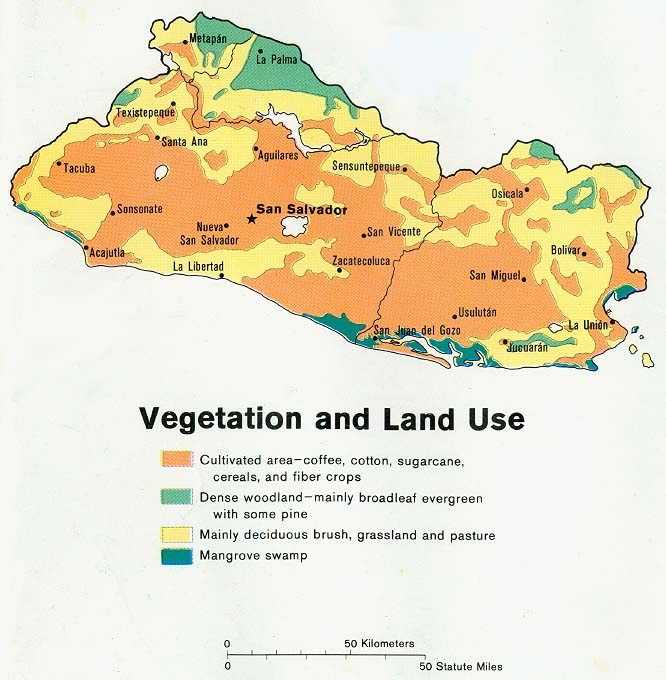
Vegetation and land use, 1980.

Two parallel mountain ranges cross El Salvador to the west with a central plateau between them and a narrow coastal plain hugging the Pacific. These physical features divide the country into two physiographic regions. The mountain ranges and central plateau, covering 85 percent of the land, comprise the interior highlands. The remaining coastal plains are referred to as the Pacific lowlands.

The northern range of mountains, the Sierra Madre, form a continuous chain along the border with Honduras. Elevations in this region range from 1,600 to 2,700 meters. The area was once heavily forested, but overexploitation led to extensive erosion, and it has become semibarren. As a result, it is the country's most sparsely populated zone, with little farming or other development.

The southern range of mountains is actually a discontinuous chain of more than twenty volcanoes, clustered into five groups. The westernmost group, near the Guatemalan border, contains Izalco and Santa Ana, which at 2,365 meters is the highest volcano in El Salvador. Between the cones lie alluvial basins and rolling hills eroded from ash deposits. The volcanic soil is rich, and much of El Salvador's coffee is planted on these slopes.

The central plateau constitutes only 25 percent of the land area but contains the heaviest concentration of population and the country's largest cities. This plain is about 50 kilometers wide and has an average elevation of 600 meters. Terrain here is rolling, with occasional escarpments, lava fields, and geysers.

A narrow plain extends from the coastal volcanic range to the Pacific Ocean. This region has a width ranging from one to thirty-two kilometers with the widest section in the east, adjacent to the Golfo de Fonseca. Near La Libertad, however, the mass of the mountains pushes the lowlands out; the slopes of adjacent volcanoes come down directly to the ocean. Surfaces in the Pacific lowlands are generally flat or gently rolling and result from the alluvial deposits of nearby slopes.

El Salvador has over 300 rivers, the most important of which is the Río Lempa. Rising in Guatemala, the Río Lempa cuts across the northern range of mountains, flows along much of the central plateau, and finally cuts through the southern volcanic range to empty into the Pacific. It is El Salvador's only navigable river; it and its tributaries drain about half the country. Other rivers are generally short and drain the Pacific lowlands or flow from the central plateau through gaps in the southern mountain range to the Pacific.

Numerous lakes of volcanic origin are found in the interior highlands; many of these lakes are surrounded by mountains and have high, steep banks. The largest lake, the Lago de Ilopango, lies just to the east of the capital. Other large lakes include the Lago de Coatepeque in the west and the Lago de Güija on the Guatemalan border. The Cerrón Grande Dam on the Río Lempa has created a large reservoir, the Embalse Cerrón Grande, in northern El Salvador.

Izalco has erupted at least 54 times since 1770. It earned the nickname "Lighthouse of the Pacific" because it served as a beacon for ships during the night.

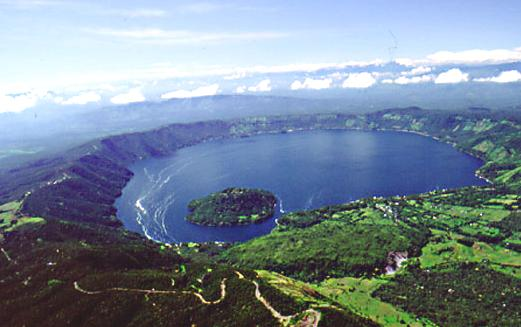
Coatepeque Caldera

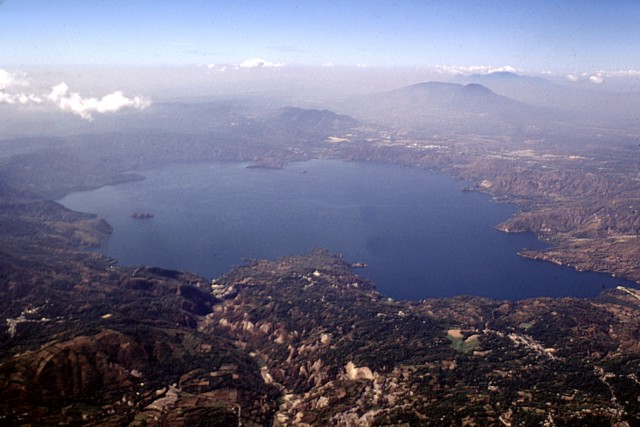
Lake Ilopango

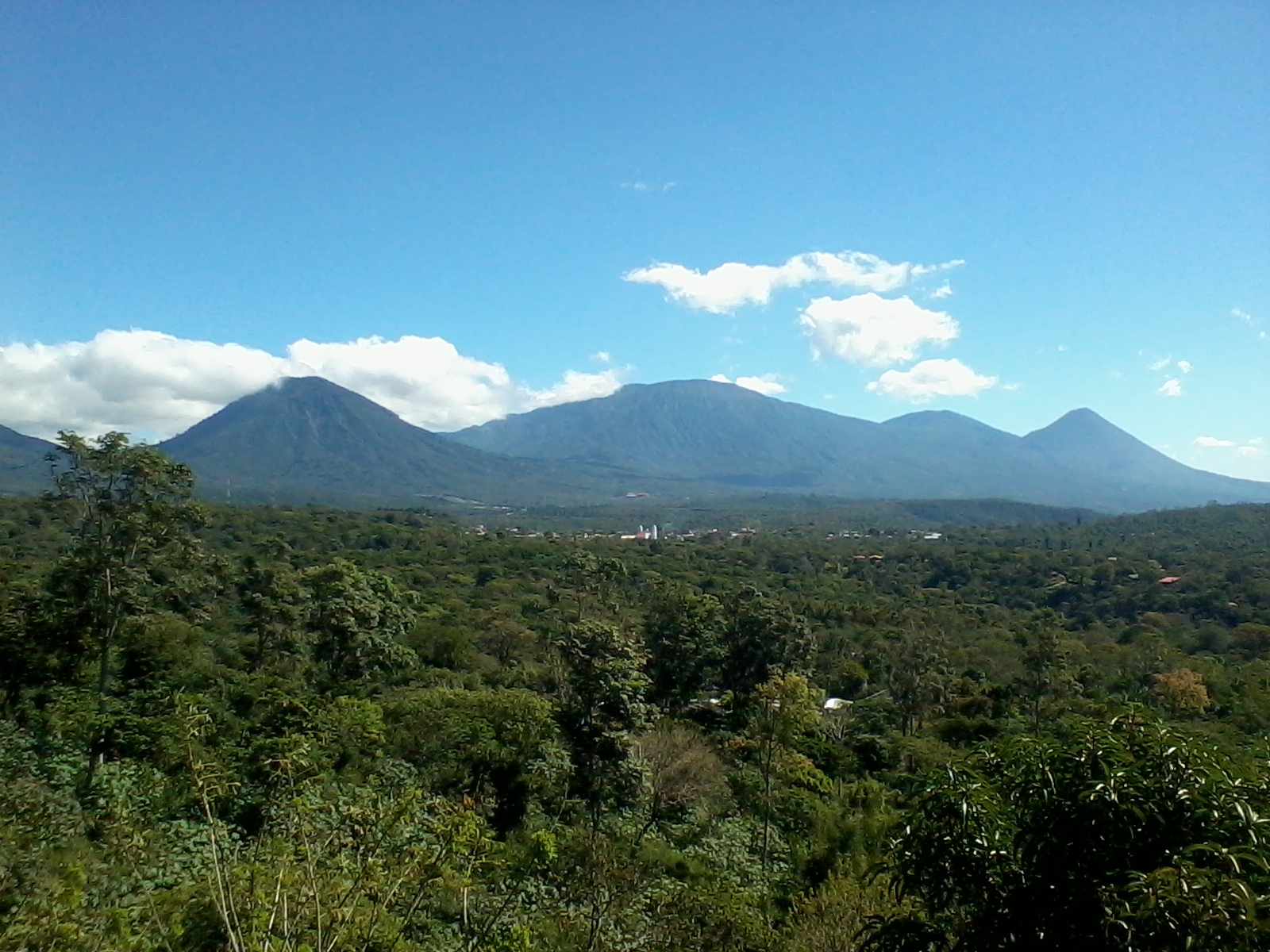
Cordillera de Apaneca

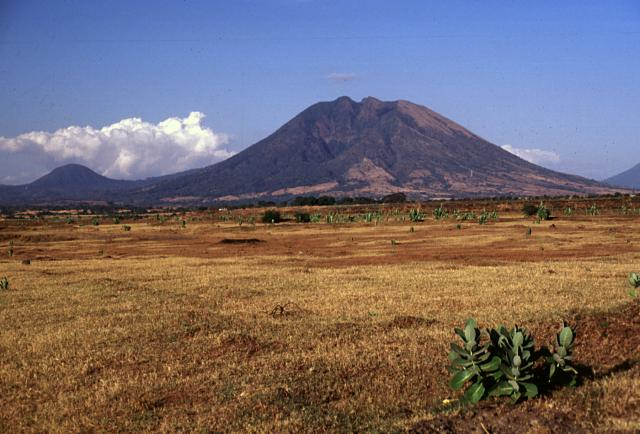
Usulután (volcano)

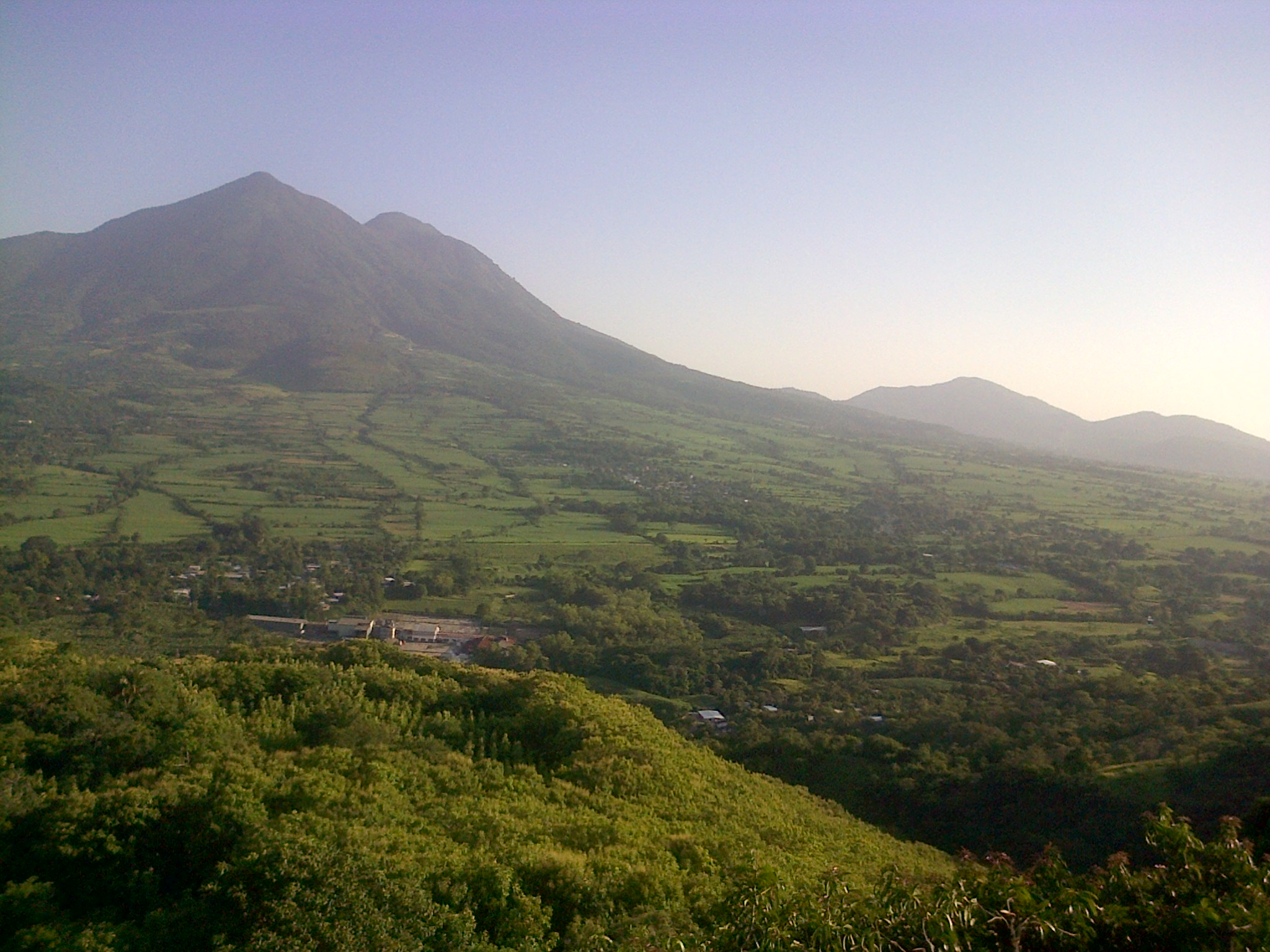
San Vicente (volcano)

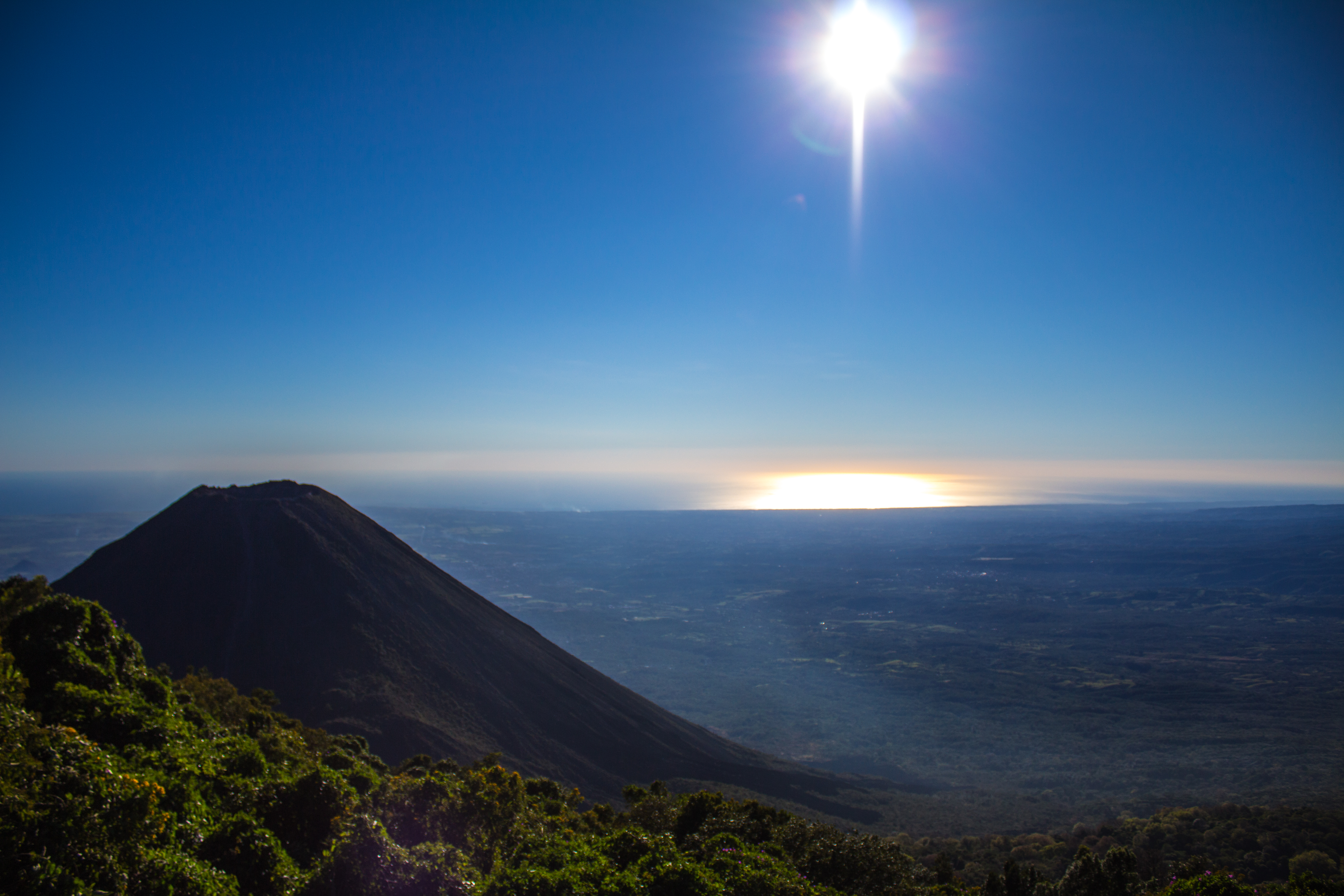
Izalco (volcano)

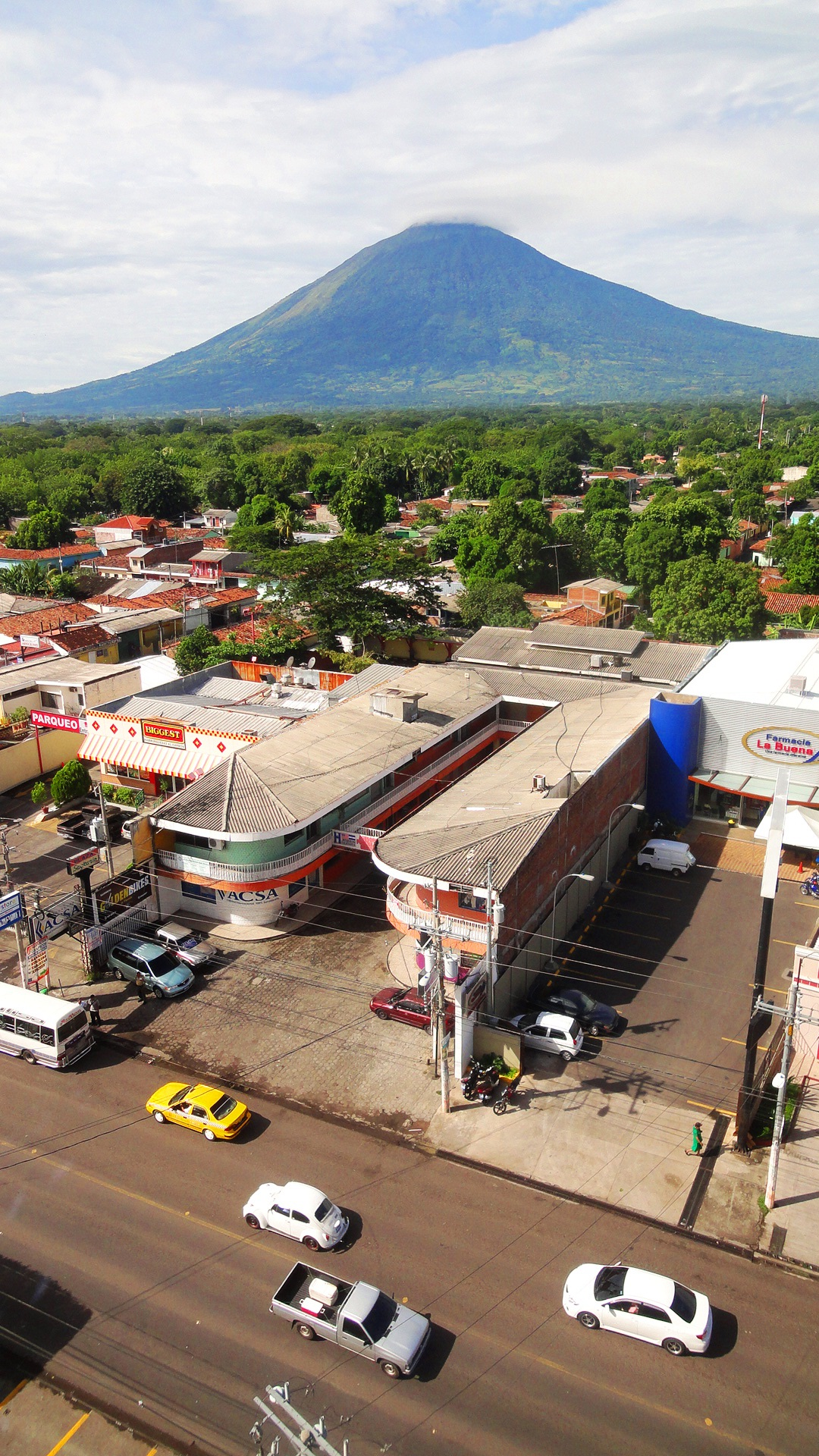
San Miguel (volcano)

== Climate ==
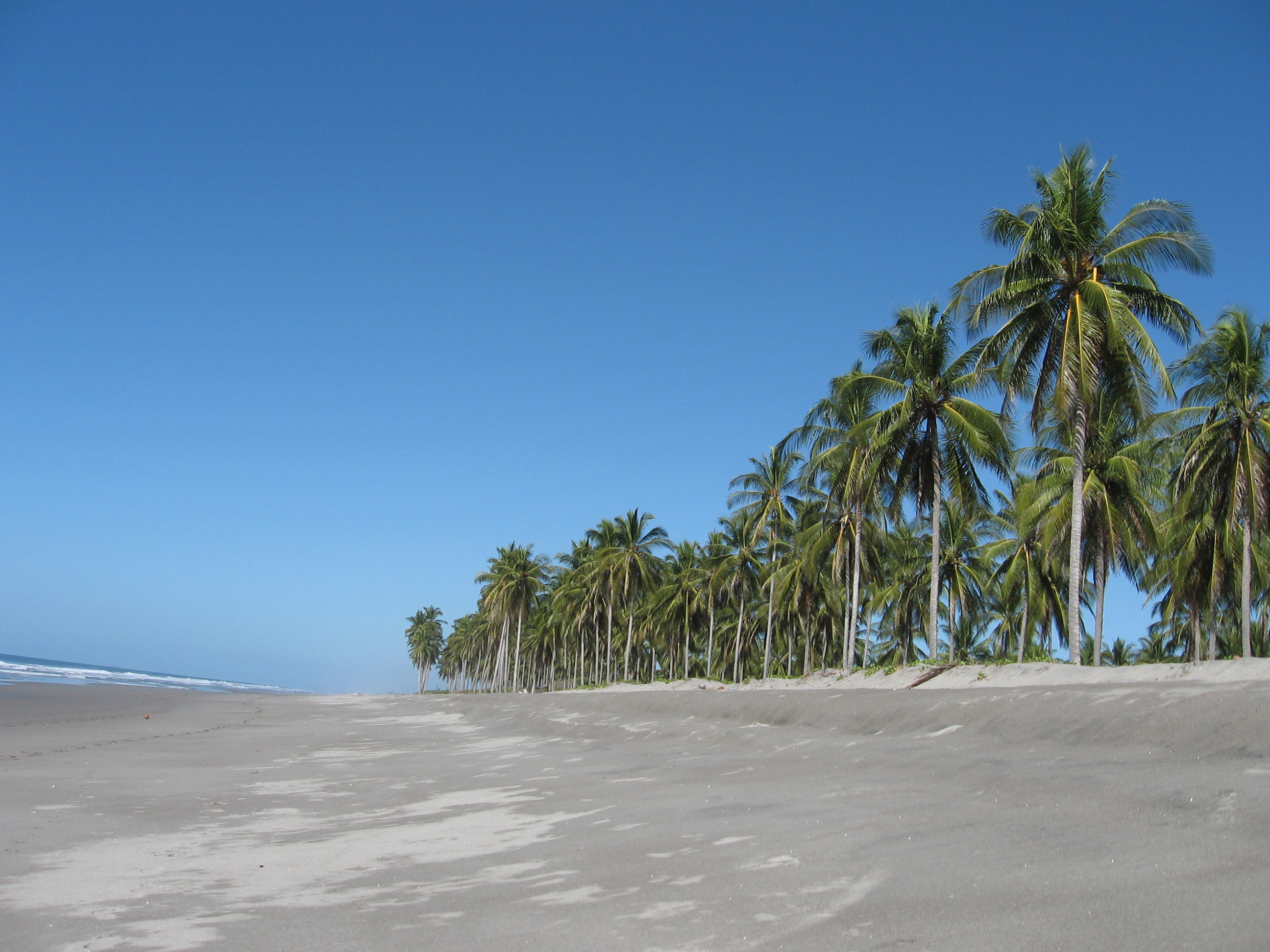
Corral de Mulas beach, Usulutan

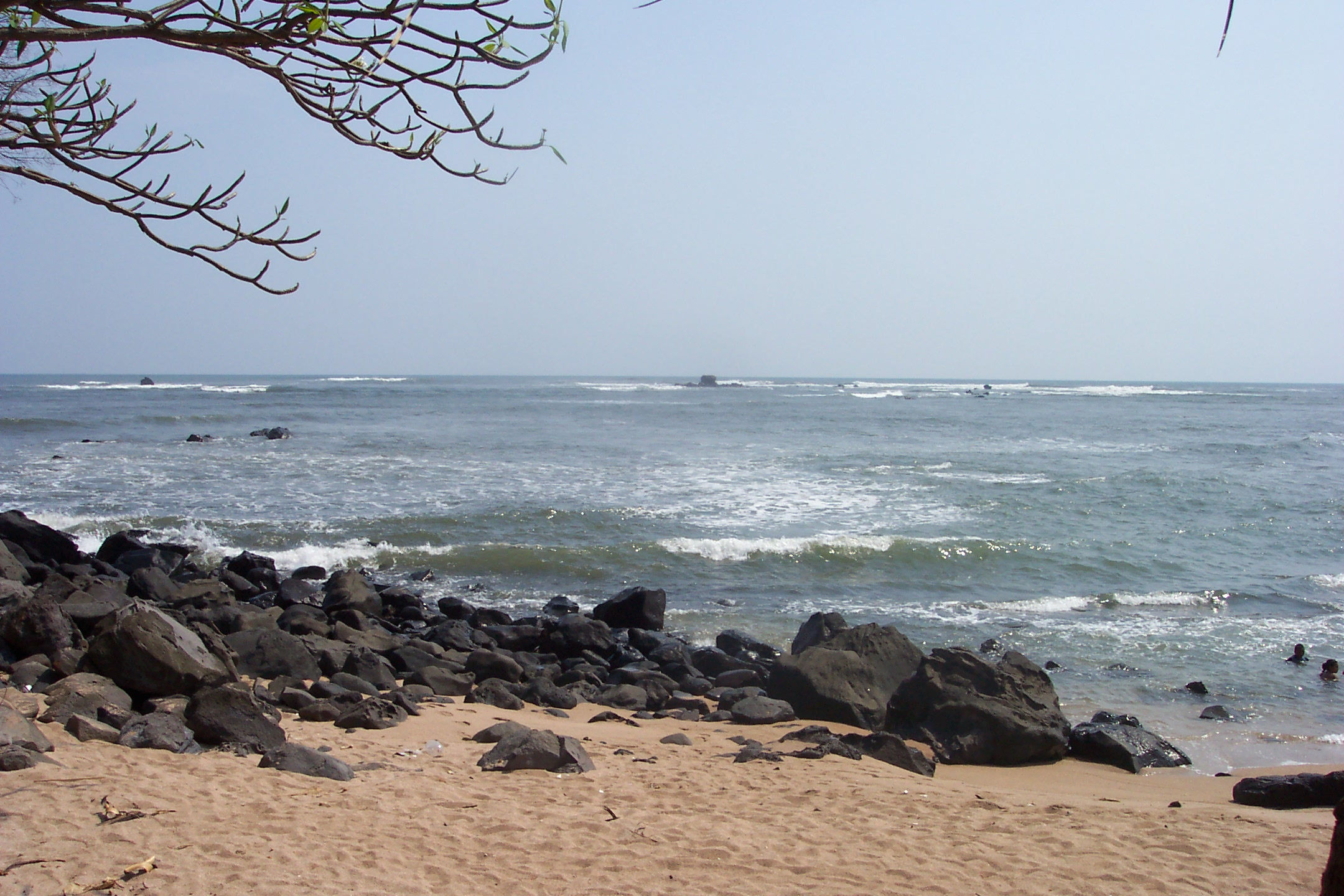
Los Cobanos beach in Sonsonate

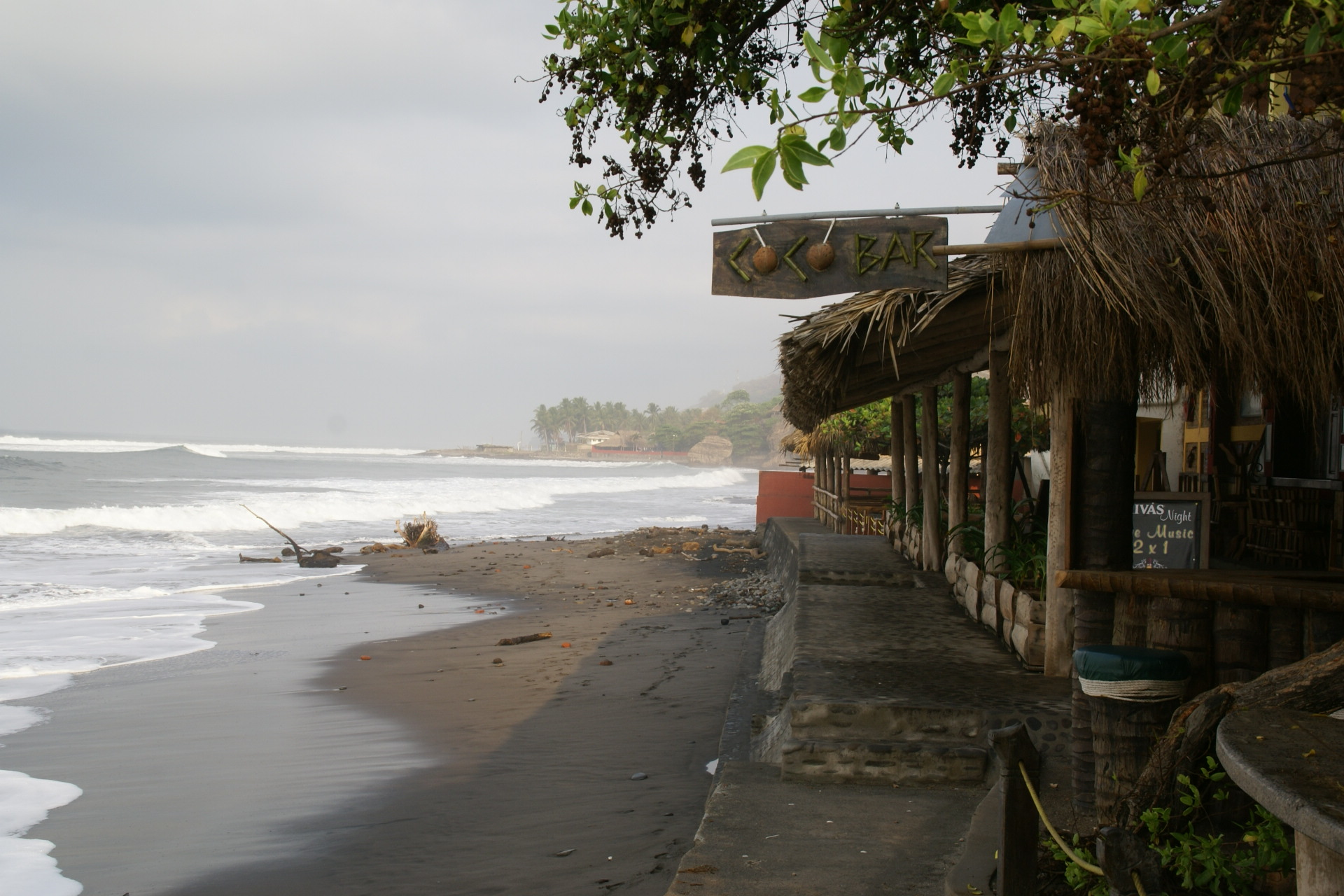
Sunzal beach, La Libertad, La Libertad

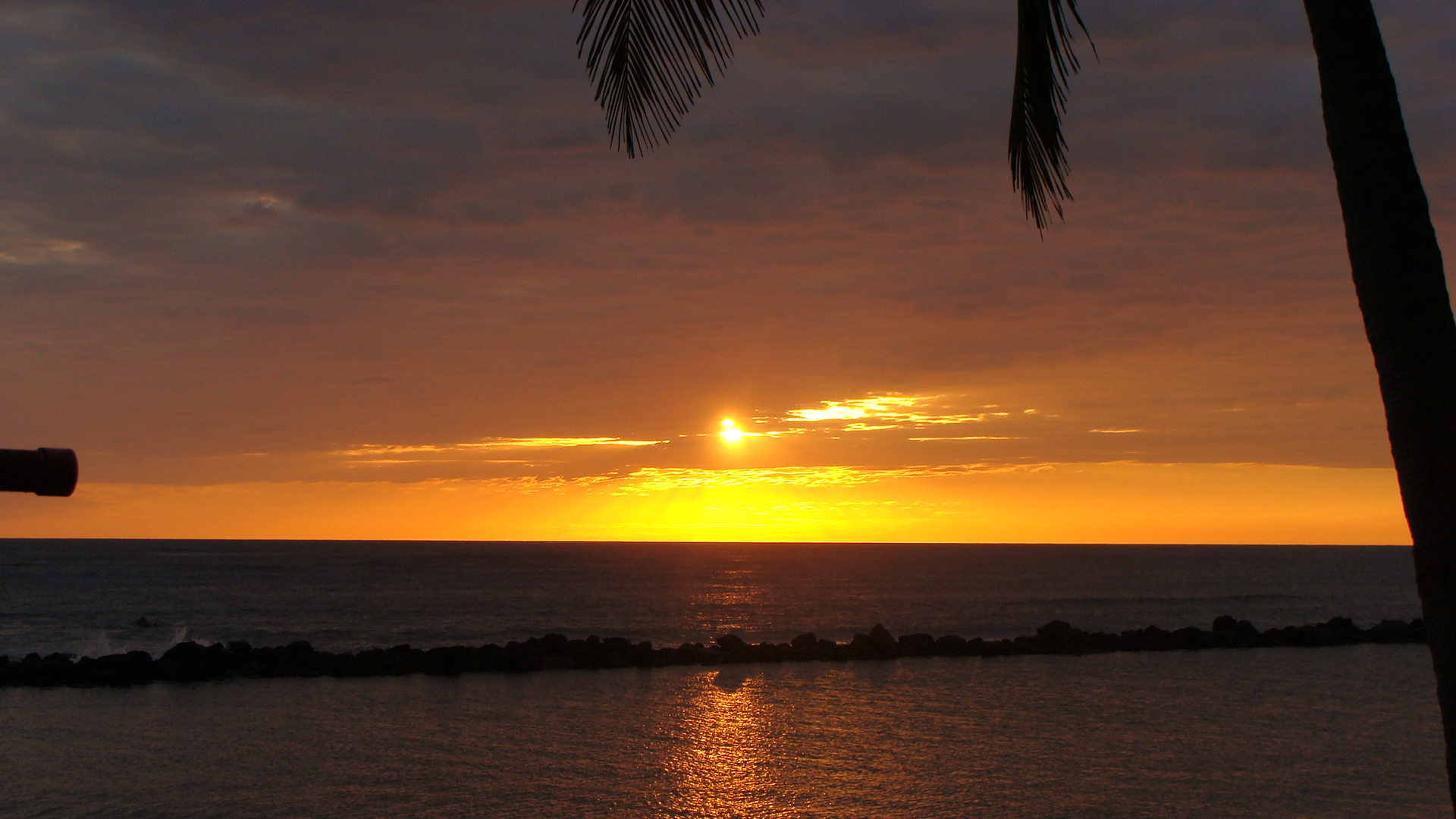
Pacific sunset at Salinitas beach Sonsonate

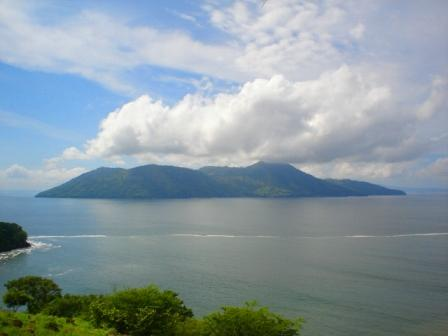
Meanguera island Gulf of Fonseca

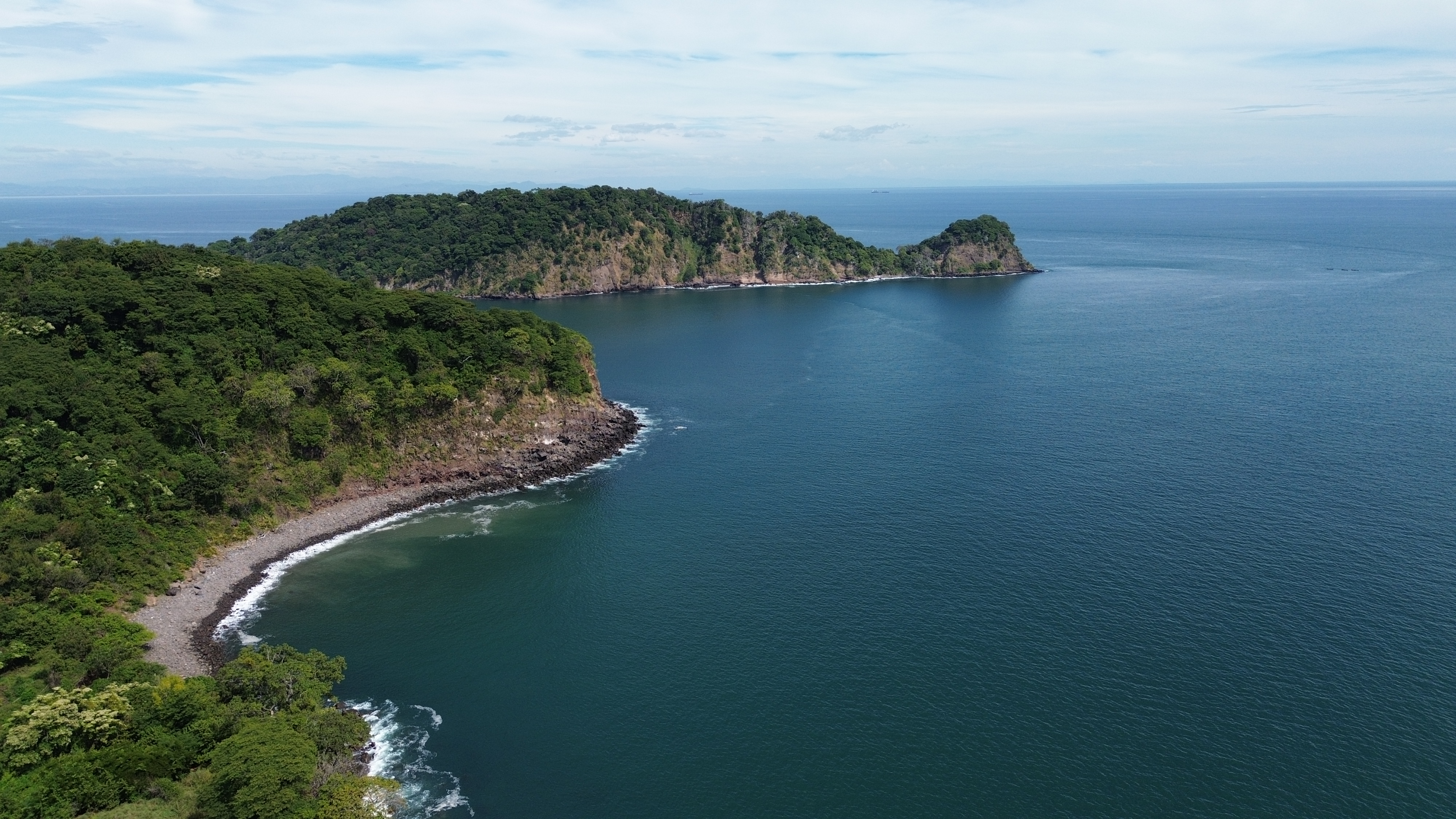
Meanguera del Golfo

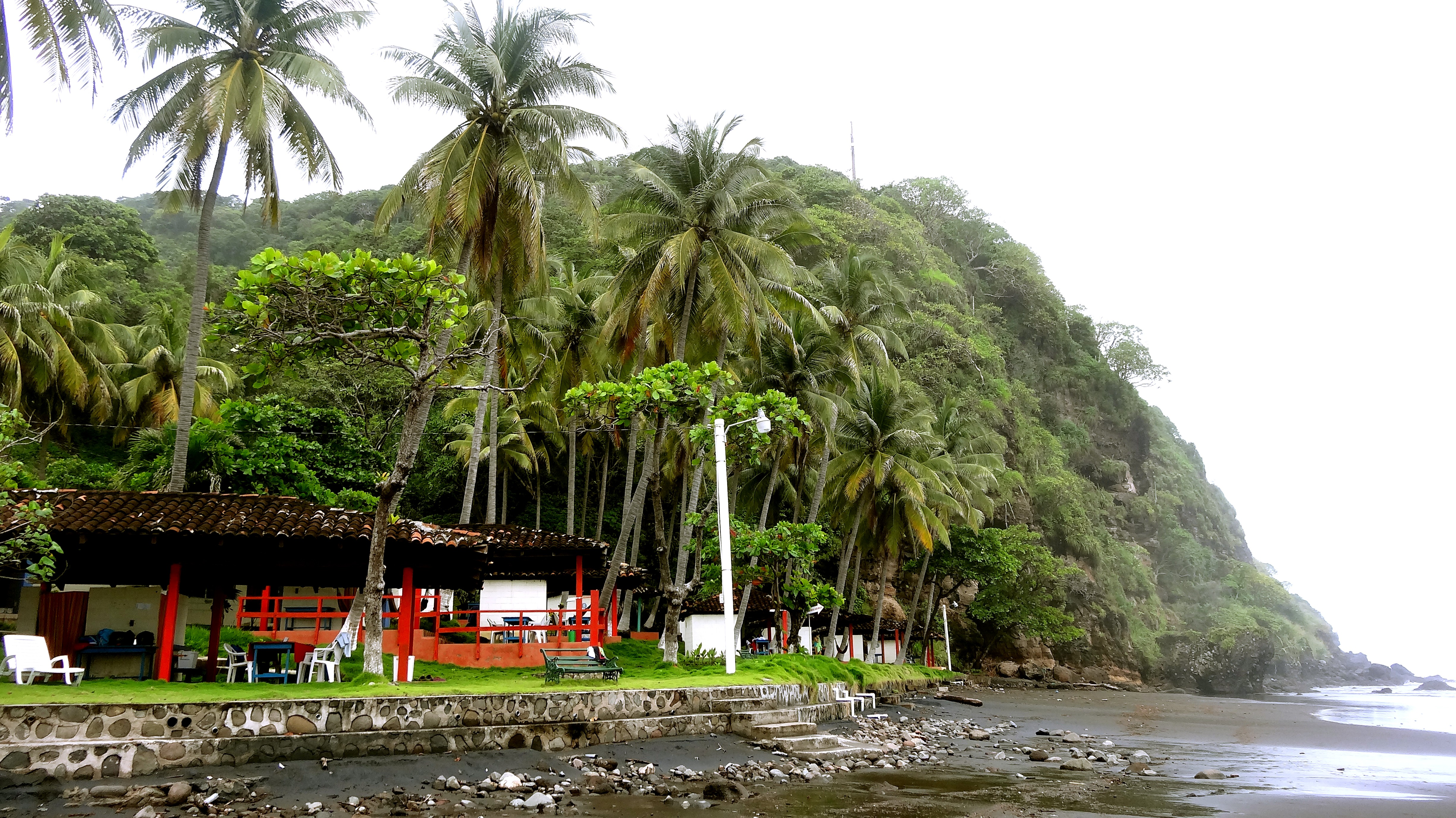
El Balsamar, La Libertad Department (El Salvador)

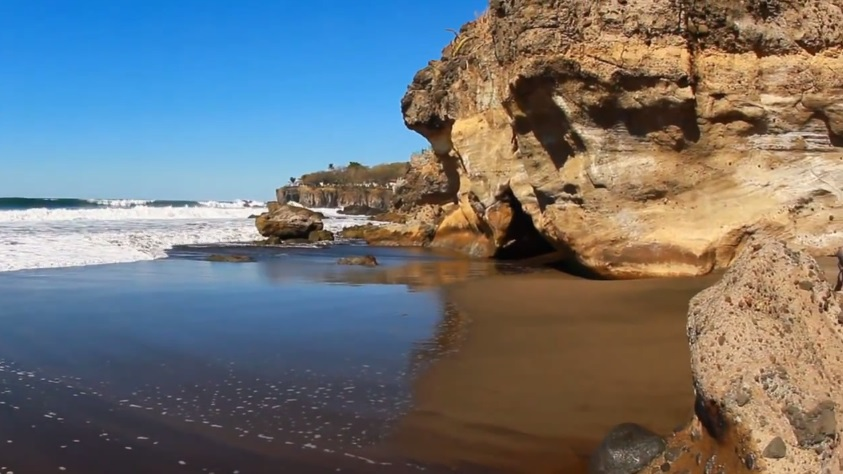
El Sunzal beach in La Libertad, La Libertad

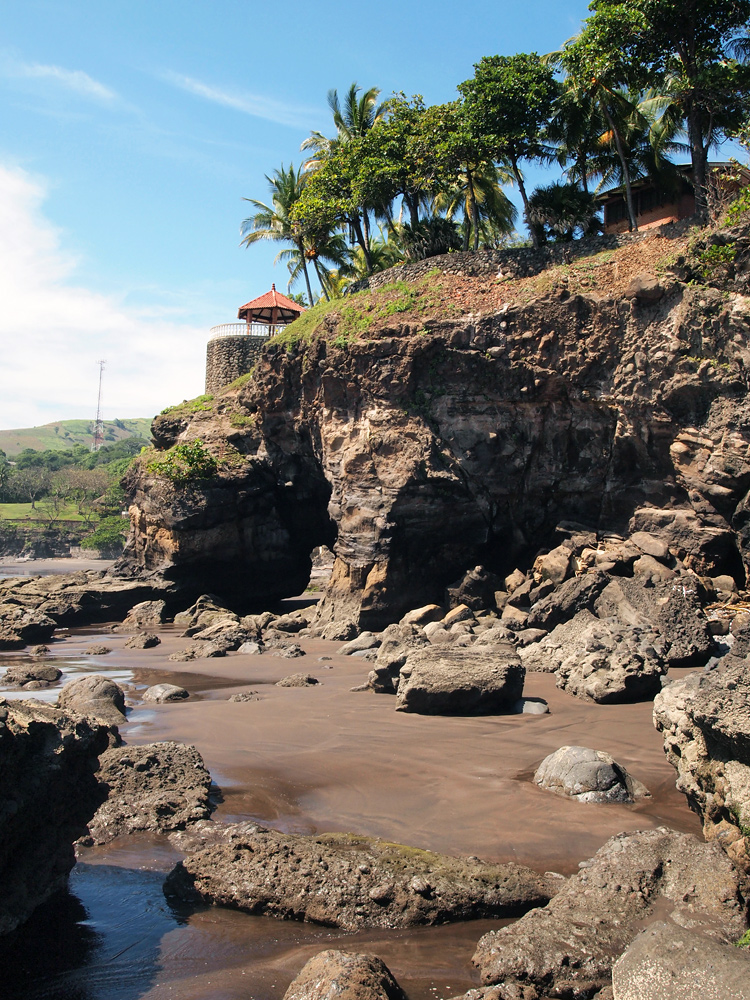
El Zonte Beach

Köppen climate classification of El Salvador.

El Salvador has a tropical climate with pronounced wet and dry seasons. Temperatures vary primarily with elevation and show little seasonal change. The Pacific lowlands are uniformly hot and humid; the central plateau and mountain areas are more moderate.

The rainy season, known locally as invierno, or winter, extends from May to October. Almost all the annual rainfall during this time, and yearly rain totals, particularly on southern-facing mountain slopes, can be as high as 2,000 millimeters (78.7 in). Protected areas and the central plateau receive lesser, although still significant, amounts. Rainfall during this season generally comes from low pressure over the Pacific and usually falls in heavy afternoon thunderstorms. Although hurricanes occasionally form in the Pacific, they seldom affect El Salvador, with the notable exception of Hurricane Mitch in 1998 (which actually formed over the Atlantic Basin) and Hurricane Emily in 1973.

From November through April, the northeast trade winds control weather patterns. During these months, air flowing from the Caribbean has lost most of its precipitation while passing over the mountains in Honduras. By the time this air reaches El Salvador, it is dry, hot, and hazy. This season is known locally as verano, or summer.

Temperatures vary little with season; elevation is the primary determinant. The Pacific lowlands are the hottest region, with annual averages ranging from 25 to 29 °C (77.0 to 84.2 °F). San Salvador is representative of the central plateau, with an annual average temperature of 23 °C (73 °F) and absolute high and low readings of 38 and 6 °C (100.4 and 42.8 °F), respectively. Mountain areas are the coolest, with annual averages from 12 to 23 °C (53.6 to 73.4 °F) and minimum temperatures sometimes approaching freezing.

Climate data for San Salvador (Ilopango International Airport) 1981-2010, extremes 1957-present
Month	Jan	Feb	Mar	Apr	May	Jun	Jul	Aug	Sep	Oct	Nov	Dec	Year
Record high °C (°F)	36.0 (96.8)	36.1 (97.0)	37.2 (99.0)	38.4 (101.1)	36.7 (98.1)	34.6 (94.3)	34.5 (94.1)	35.1 (95.2)	33.3 (91.9)	35.6 (96.1)	35.3 (95.5)	35.7 (96.3)	38.4 (101.1)
Mean daily maximum °C (°F)	30.8 (87.4)	32.0 (89.6)	32.7 (90.9)	32.7 (90.9)	31.1 (88.0)	30.1 (86.2)	30.3 (86.5)	30.5 (86.9)	29.5 (85.1)	29.5 (85.1)	29.9 (85.8)	30.2 (86.4)	30.8 (87.4)
Daily mean °C (°F)	22.8 (73.0)	23.6 (74.5)	24.2 (75.6)	25.0 (77.0)	24.6 (76.3)	23.9 (75.0)	23.9 (75.0)	23.9 (75.0)	23.3 (73.9)	23.3 (73.9)	23.0 (73.4)	22.8 (73.0)	23.7 (74.7)
Mean daily minimum °C (°F)	16.9 (62.4)	17.6 (63.7)	18.4 (65.1)	19.8 (67.6)	20.4 (68.7)	20.0 (68.0)	19.5 (67.1)	19.7 (67.5)	19.6 (67.3)	19.3 (66.7)	18.4 (65.1)	17.5 (63.5)	18.9 (66.0)
Record low °C (°F)	11.9 (53.4)	12.0 (53.6)	13.0 (55.4)	12.0 (53.6)	12.0 (53.6)	15.5 (59.9)	13.5 (56.3)	12.2 (54.0)	15.0 (59.0)	12.5 (54.5)	11.1 (52.0)	12.0 (53.6)	11.1 (52.0)
Average rainfall mm (inches)	1 (0.0)	2 (0.1)	10 (0.4)	36 (1.4)	176 (6.9)	279 (11.0)	355 (14.0)	319 (12.6)	338 (13.3)	208 (8.2)	53 (2.1)	9 (0.4)	1,786 (70.4)
Average rainy days (≥ 0.1 mm)	1	1	1	5	13	20	20	20	20	16	4	2	123
Average relative humidity (%)	67	66	67	72	80	83	82	83	86	83	76	72	77
Mean monthly sunshine hours	301	277	294	243	220	174	239	257	180	211	267	294	2,957
Source 1: Ministerio de Medio Ambiente y Recursos Naturales
Source 2: Danish Meteorological Institute (precipitation days and sun 1931–1960), Meteo Climat (record highs and lows)

Climate data for Santa Ana, El Salvador (1981–2010)
Month	Jan	Feb	Mar	Apr	May	Jun	Jul	Aug	Sep	Oct	Nov	Dec	Year
Record high °C (°F)	33.5 (92.3)	35.7 (96.3)	37.0 (98.6)	36.0 (96.8)	35.4 (95.7)	33.8 (92.8)	32.7 (90.9)	33.6 (92.5)	32.3 (90.1)	32.5 (90.5)	32.5 (90.5)	33.5 (92.3)	37.0 (98.6)
Mean daily maximum °C (°F)	30.8 (87.4)	32.1 (89.8)	33.7 (92.7)	34.1 (93.4)	32.3 (90.1)	30.9 (87.6)	31.1 (88.0)	31.1 (88.0)	30.3 (86.5)	30.1 (86.2)	30.0 (86.0)	30.3 (86.5)	31.4 (88.5)
Daily mean °C (°F)	23.7 (74.7)	24.6 (76.3)	25.7 (78.3)	26.6 (79.9)	26.2 (79.2)	25.3 (77.5)	25.3 (77.5)	25.3 (77.5)	24.7 (76.5)	24.5 (76.1)	24.0 (75.2)	23.8 (74.8)	25.0 (77.0)
Mean daily minimum °C (°F)	16.3 (61.3)	17.0 (62.6)	17.7 (63.9)	18.9 (66.0)	19.6 (67.3)	19.5 (67.1)	19.2 (66.6)	19.3 (66.7)	19.1 (66.4)	19.0 (66.2)	17.8 (64.0)	16.9 (62.4)	18.4 (65.1)
Record low °C (°F)	11.0 (51.8)	8.0 (46.4)	11.6 (52.9)	13.0 (55.4)	14.5 (58.1)	13.0 (55.4)	15.0 (59.0)	15.5 (59.9)	15.4 (59.7)	15.0 (59.0)	12.5 (54.5)	10.0 (50.0)	8.0 (46.4)
Average precipitation mm (inches)	2 (0.1)	6 (0.2)	8 (0.3)	57 (2.2)	188 (7.4)	322 (12.7)	297 (11.7)	313 (12.3)	315 (12.4)	185 (7.3)	38 (1.5)	13 (0.5)	1,745 (68.7)
Average relative humidity (%)	66	63	63	64	73	80	77	78	82	78	72	68	72
Mean monthly sunshine hours	310.0	271.2	291.4	258.0	254.2	198.0	263.5	260.4	204.0	229.4	267.0	303.8	3,110.9
Mean daily sunshine hours	10.0	9.6	9.4	8.6	8.2	6.6	8.5	8.4	6.8	7.4	8.9	9.8	8.5
Source 1: Ministerio de Medio Ambiente y Recursos Naturales
Source 2: Deutscher Wetterdienst (precipitation days and sun)

Climate data for San Miguel, El Salvador (1981–2010)
Month	Jan	Feb	Mar	Apr	May	Jun	Jul	Aug	Sep	Oct	Nov	Dec	Year
Mean daily maximum °C (°F)	36.9 (98.4)	38.0 (100.4)	38.4 (101.1)	38.6 (101.5)	36.2 (97.2)	34.4 (93.9)	34.9 (94.8)	34.9 (94.8)	33.9 (93.0)	33.2 (91.8)	34.2 (93.6)	35.6 (96.1)	35.7 (96.3)
Daily mean °C (°F)	27.6 (81.7)	28.4 (83.1)	29.5 (85.1)	30.6 (87.1)	29.8 (85.6)	28.6 (83.5)	28.5 (83.3)	28.5 (83.3)	27.9 (82.2)	27.6 (81.7)	27.4 (81.3)	27.3 (81.1)	28.5 (83.3)
Mean daily minimum °C (°F)	18.3 (64.9)	18.9 (66.0)	20.5 (68.9)	22.7 (72.9)	23.3 (73.9)	22.8 (73.0)	22.2 (72.0)	22.2 (72.0)	22.3 (72.1)	22.0 (71.6)	20.6 (69.1)	19.0 (66.2)	21.2 (70.2)
Average precipitation mm (inches)	1 (0.0)	1 (0.0)	6 (0.2)	24 (0.9)	207 (8.1)	239 (9.4)	212 (8.3)	255 (10.0)	321 (12.6)	210 (8.3)	59 (2.3)	7 (0.3)	1,544 (60.8)
Average relative humidity (%)	59	57	57	62	71	77	75	76	81	81	73	64	70
Source: Ministerio de Medio Ambiente y Recursos Naturales

== Other facts ==
Departments of El Salvador

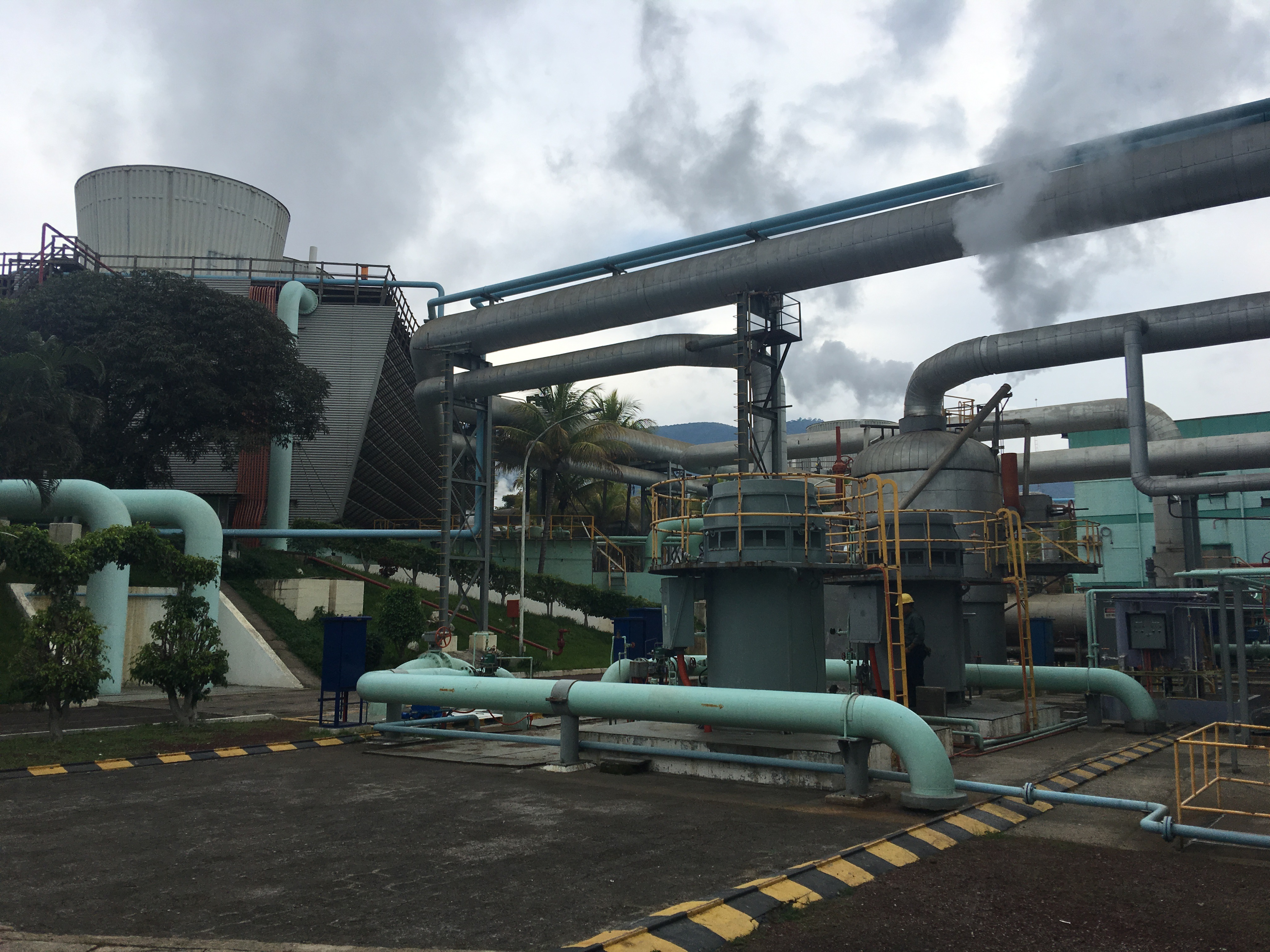
Geothermal power plant in Ahuachapan Department

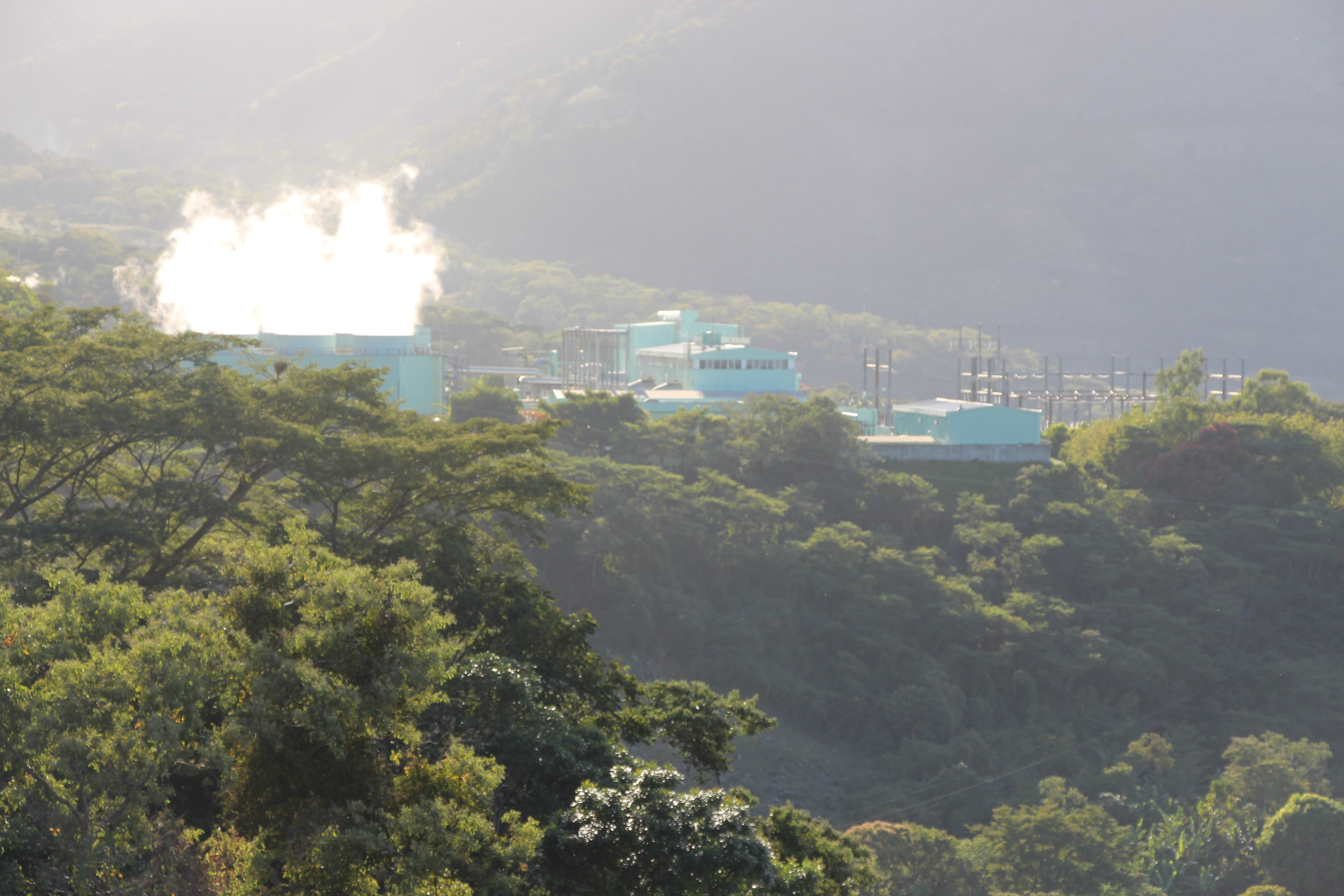
Geothermal power center in the Usulután Department

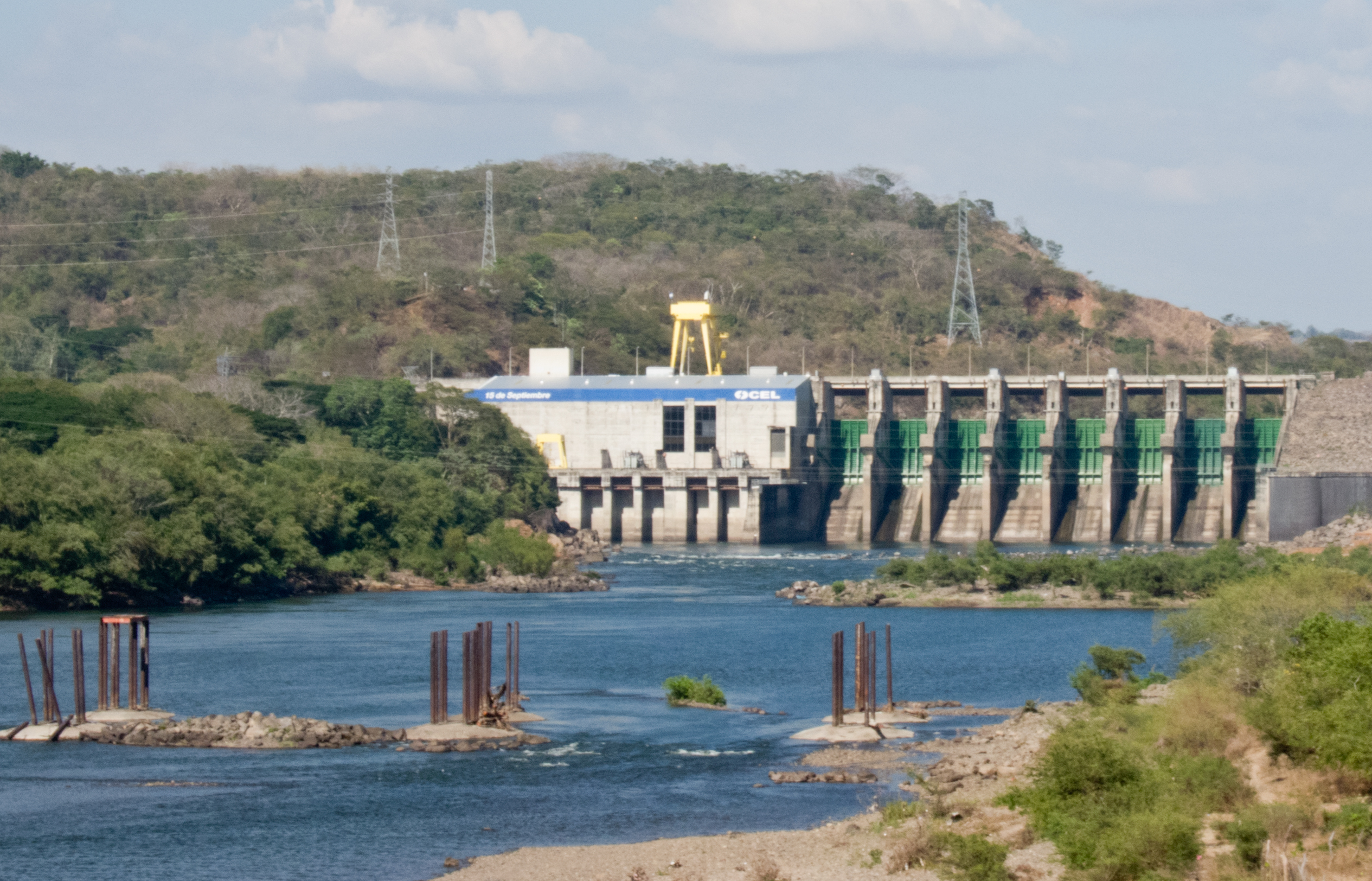
Central Hydroelectricity dam over the Lempa River

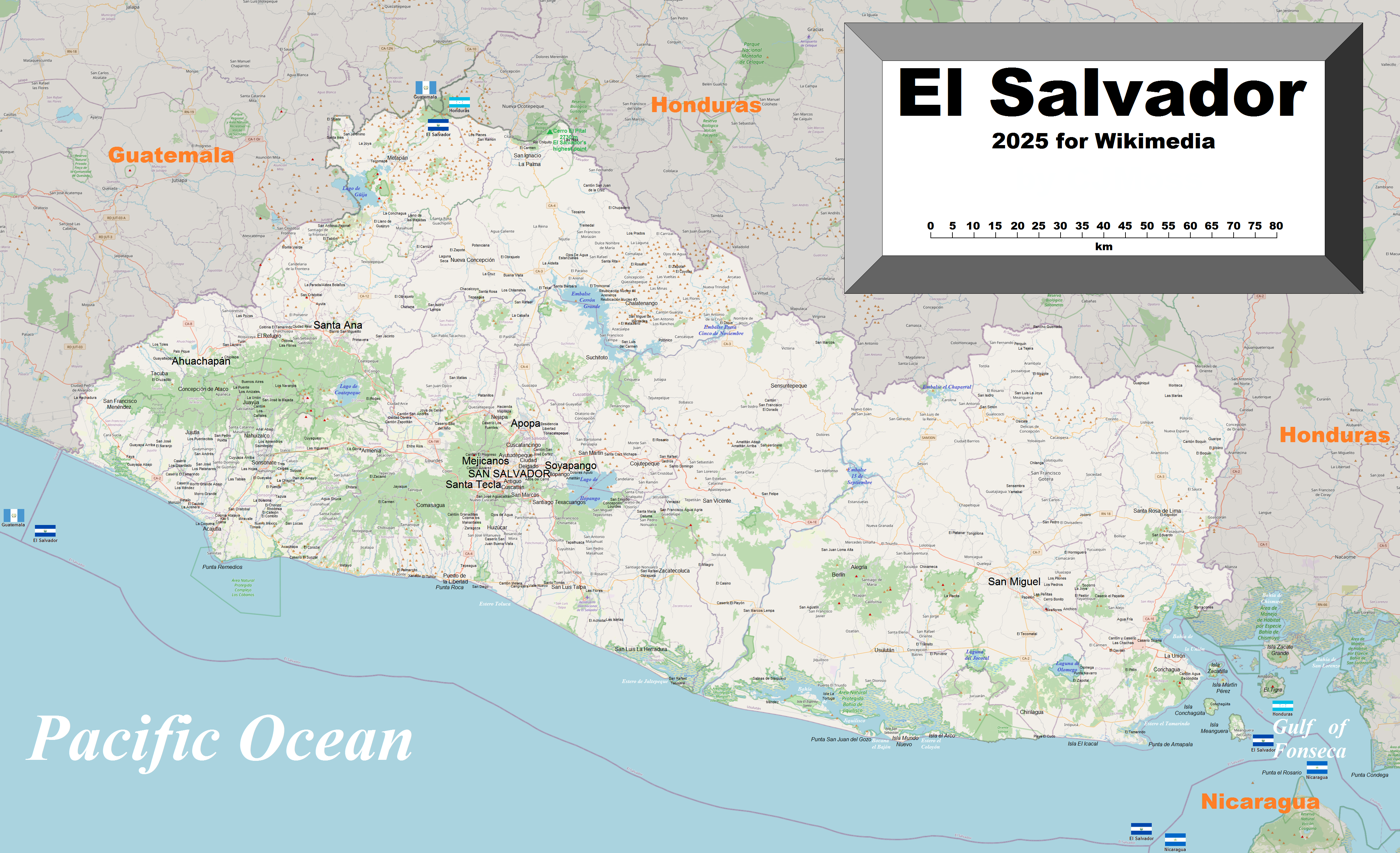
Detailed map of El Salvador

The total land area of El Salvador is 23,041 km^{2}, with 20,721 km^{2} of land and 320 km^{2} of water. El Salvador is about the size of Israel and the U.S. states of New Jersey and Vermont, but has the population size of Libya and Lebanon. El Salvador has 590 km of borders, including 391 km of borders with Honduras and 199 km with Guatemala. El Salvador has a coastline of 307 km.

El Salvador claims a territorial sea of 200 nautical miles (370.4 km; 230.2 mi).

The lowest point of elevation in El Salvador is the Pacific Ocean, at sea level. The highest point is Cerro El Pital, at 2,730 m.

Maritime claims:
Exclusive economic zone: 90,962 km^{2} (35,121 mi^{2})

Natural resources: Hydropower, geothermal power, petroleum, arable land

Land use (2012 estimate) includes 34.03 percent arable land, 10.86 percent permanent crops, 55.12 percent other.

Irrigated land: 449.9 km^{2} (2003)

Total renewable water resources: 25.23 km^{3} (2011)

Natural hazards: El Salvador is known as the "Land of Volcanoes"; there are frequent and sometimes very destructive earthquakes and volcanic activity; hurricanes rarely make direct landfall.

== Extreme points ==
- Northernmost point – north of El Limo, Santa Ana Department
- Southernmost point – El Jaguey, La Unión Department
- Westernmost point – border with Guatemala, Ahuachapán Department
- Easternmost point – island of Meanguera del Golfo, La Unión Department
- Highest point – Cerro El Pital: 2730 m
- Lowest point – Pacific Ocean: 0 m

== Environmental issues ==
Deforestation; soil erosion; water pollution; contamination of soils from disposal of toxic wastes.

El Salvador is party to the Convention on Biological Diversity, United Nations Framework Convention on Climate Change, Kyoto Protocol to the United Nations Framework Convention on Climate Change, United Nations Convention to Combat Desertification, CITES, Basel Convention, Partial Test Ban Treaty, Montreal Protocol, Ramsar Convention. El Salvador has signed, but not ratified the United Nations Convention on the Law of the Sea.

=== Deforestation ===
==== Tree cover extent and loss ====
Global Forest Watch publishes annual estimates of tree cover loss and 2000 tree cover extent derived from time-series analysis of Landsat satellite imagery in the Global Forest Change dataset. In this framework, tree cover refers to vegetation taller than 5 m (including natural forests and tree plantations), and tree cover loss is defined as the complete removal of tree cover canopy for a given year, regardless of cause.

For El Salvador, country statistics report cumulative tree cover loss of 85,433 ha (854.33 km^{2}) from 2001 to 2024 (about 8.6% of its 2000 tree cover area). For tree cover density greater than 30%, country statistics report a 2000 tree cover extent of 988,821 ha (9,888.21 km^{2}). The charts and table below display this data. In simple terms, the annual loss number is the area where tree cover disappeared in that year, and the extent number shows what remains of the 2000 tree cover baseline after subtracting cumulative loss. Forest regrowth is not included in the dataset.

Annual tree cover loss in El Salvador, 2001–2024. View chart definition.
Tree cover extent in 2000 minus cumulative tree cover loss in El Salvador, 2001–2024 (loss-only residual; does not account for gain). View chart definition.

Annual tree cover extent and loss
Year	Tree cover extent (km2) (Note: This residual measure does not include forest regrowth.)	Annual tree cover loss (km2)
2001	9,793.21	95.00
2002	9,746.55	46.66
2003	9,686.71	59.84
2004	9,641.16	45.55
2005	9,582.36	58.80
2006	9,536.31	46.05
2007	9,506.47	29.84
2008	9,473.23	33.24
2009	9,430.38	42.85
2010	9,401.65	28.73
2011	9,369.23	32.42
2012	9,343.87	25.36
2013	9,323.33	20.54
2014	9,300.13	23.20
2015	9,276.24	23.89
2016	9,218.81	57.43
2017	9,171.36	47.45
2018	9,144.32	27.04
2019	9,121.82	22.50
2020	9,099.73	22.09
2021	9,084.85	14.88
2022	9,068.53	16.32
2023	9,050.68	17.85
2024	9,033.88	16.80

==== REDD+ reference level and monitoring ====
Under the UNFCCC REDD+ framework, El Salvador has submitted a national forest reference level (FRL). On the UNFCCC REDD+ Web Platform, the country’s 2021 submission is listed as having an assessed reference level, while the other Warsaw Framework elements—a national strategy, safeguards, and a national forest monitoring system—are listed as “not reported”.

The FRL was submitted in 2021 and technically assessed in 2022. It covers three REDD+ activities at national scale—reducing emissions from deforestation, reducing emissions from forest degradation, and enhancement of forest carbon stocks—and uses a 2006–2015 historical reference period for application to 2016–2025. The assessed FRL was 1,359,188 t CO2 eq per year, expressed as the net annual average of emissions and removals; according to the technical assessment, the modified submission did not change the value proposed in the original submission.

The technical assessment states that the FRL included above-ground biomass, below-ground biomass, deadwood, litter and soil organic carbon in mineral soils, and reported CO2 only. Activity data were derived from point sampling for 2001, 2011 and 2018 using Collect Earth with satellite imagery and other sources, while forest carbon stock estimates were derived from the national forest inventory. The forest definition applied in the FRL used a minimum area of 0.5 hectares, minimum height of 4 metres and canopy cover of at least 30%, and included agroforestry systems and shade coffee plantations.
