= Cordillera de Apaneca =

Volcanic mountain range in El Salvador

Coordinates: 13.9166667°N 89.7166667°W

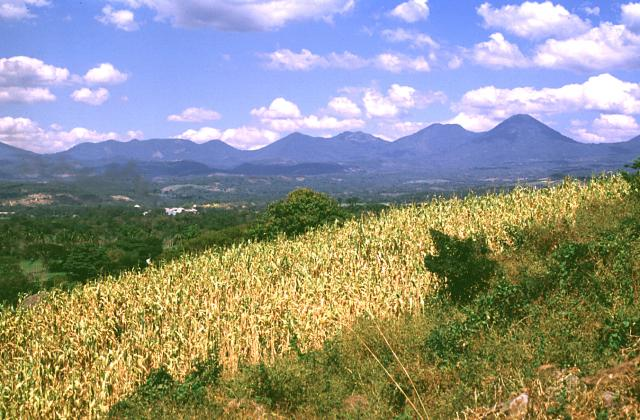
Cordillera de Apaneca Volcano Range

Cordillera de Apaneca is a volcanic mountain range in western El Salvador. It consists mainly of volcanoes. Ilamatepec volcano, one of the most active in the region, is a part of this range.

The volcanoes in the range Santa Ana Volcano, Izalco Volcano, and Cerro Verde were the inspiration for the two active and one dormant volcanoes in Antoine de Saint-Exupéry's novella The Little Prince, based on his life with his Salvadoran wife Consuelo de Saint-Exupéry, who was The Rose in the story.

Santa Ana volcano (background, far right) with Izalco to the far left, Cerro Verde center and San marcelino vents in the foreground

== See also ==
- List of volcanoes in El Salvador
