= Santa Ana Volcano =

Large stratovolcano in El Salvador

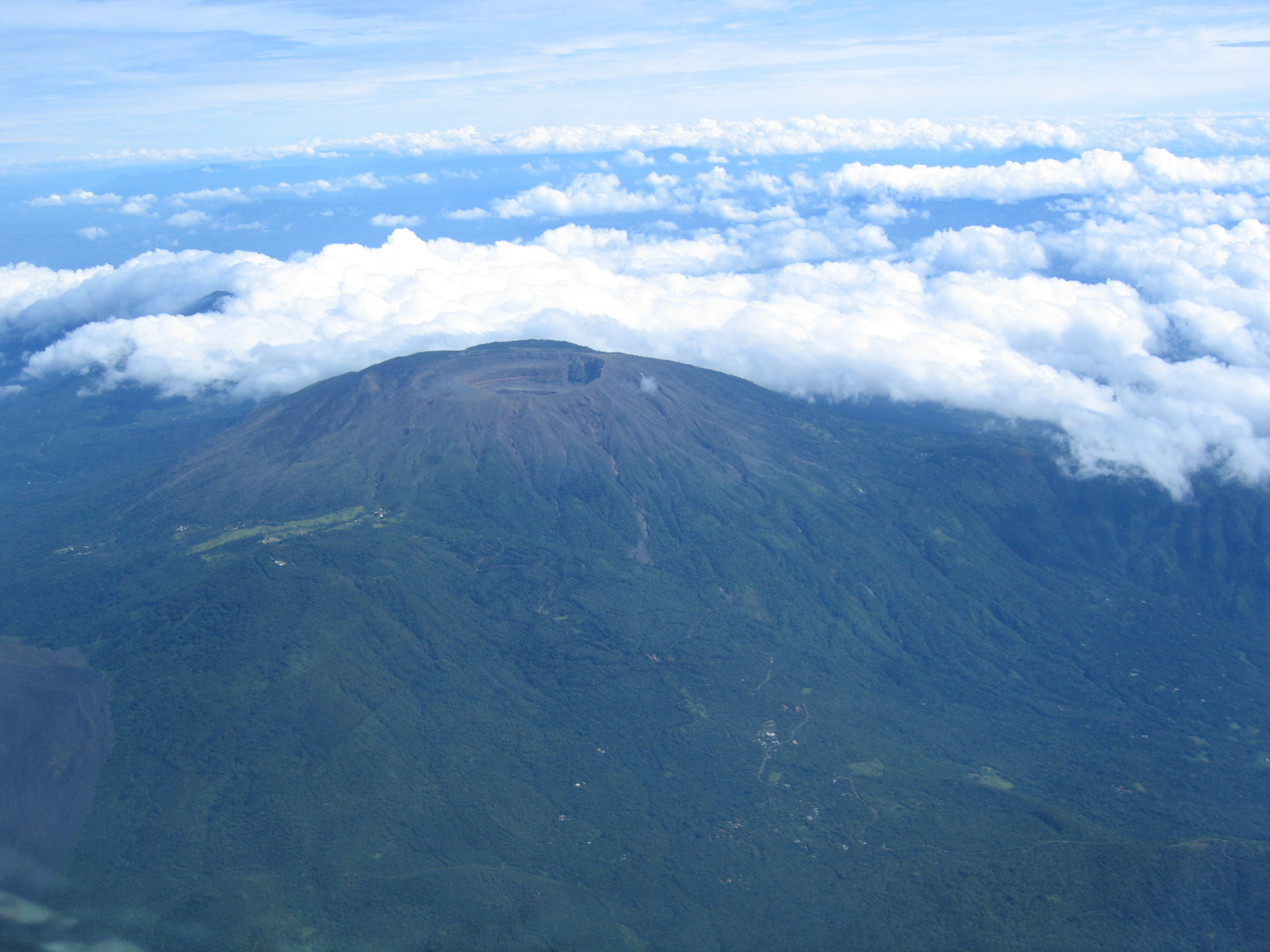

Highest point
- Elevation: 2,381 m (7,812 ft)
- Coordinates: 13°51′11″N 89°37′48″W

Geography
- Location within El Salvador
- Location: El Salvador
- Parent range: Cordillera de Apaneca

Geology
- Mountain type: Stratovolcano
- Volcanic arc: Central America Volcanic Arc
- Last eruption: 2005

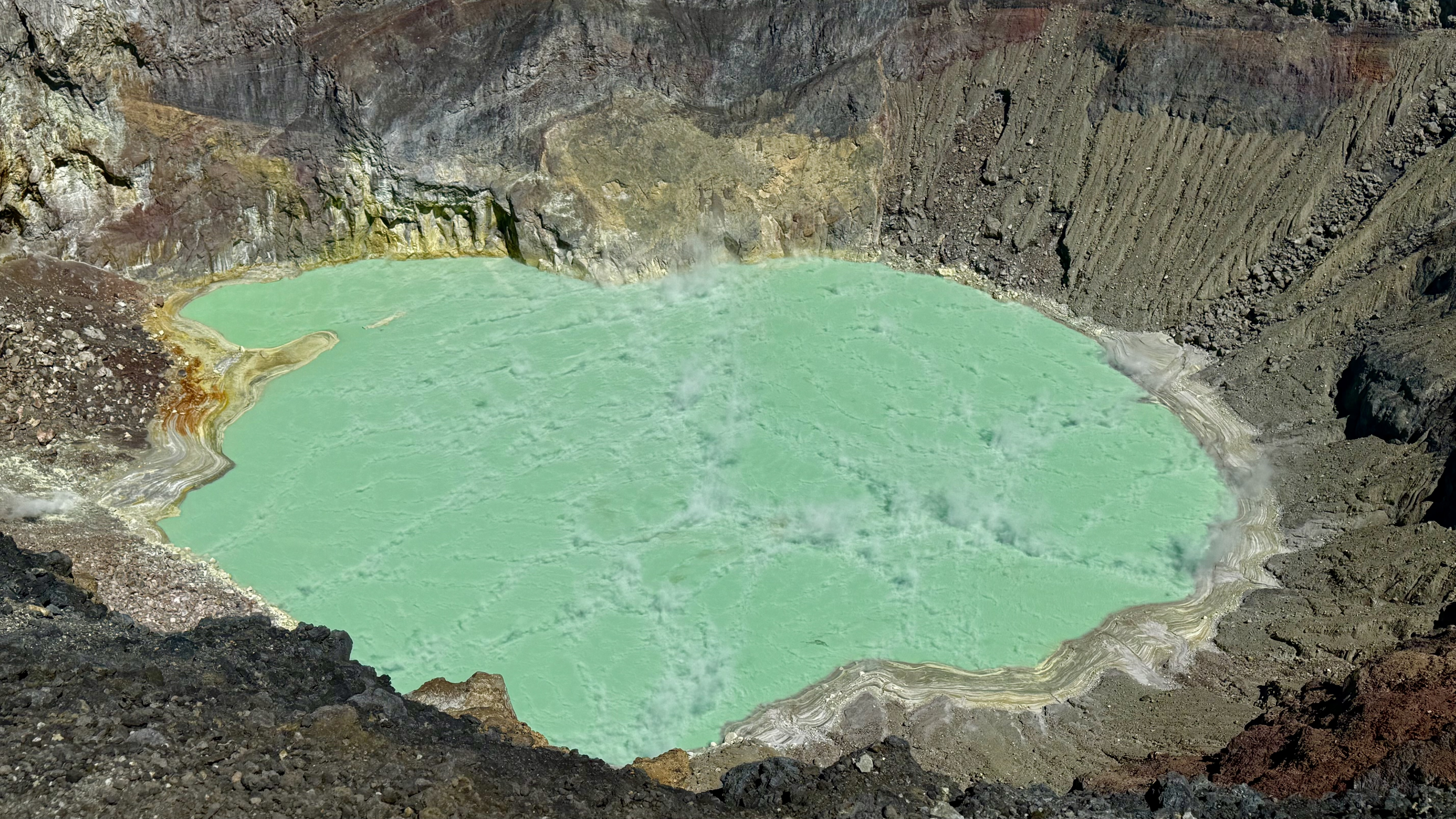
Ilamatepec Lake at the crater

The Santa Ana Volcano or Ilamatepec (Spanish: volcán de Santa Ana) is a large stratovolcano located in the Santa Ana department of El Salvador. At 2,381 metres (7,812 ft) above sea level, it is the highest volcano in the country. It is located immediately west of Coatepeque Caldera.

The volcano was the inspiration for one of the active volcanoes in Antoine de Saint-Exupéry's French novella The Little Prince, based on his life with his Salvadoran wife Consuelo de Saint-Exupéry, who was The Rose in the story.

== Geography ==
Santa Ana volcano with Izalco to the far left, Cerro Verde center, ilamatepec right, and San marcelino vents in the foreground.

The summit of Santa Ana features four nested calderas and volcanic craters, with the innermost containing a small crater lake. Collapse of the summit during the late Pleistocene (inferring from underlying soil samples, the upper age limit is no more than 57,000 years ago) produced a massive debris avalanche that reached the Pacific Ocean, forming the Acajutla Peninsula. Subsequent eruptions have largely rebuilt the edifice.

There have been numerous historical eruptions since the 16th century, both at the summit and from cinder cones on the lower flanks, and also the flank vents of San Marcelino located east of Santa Ana. The San Marcelino vents erupted in 1722 and flowed eastwards for 11 km, destroying the village of San Juan Tecpan.

In October 2005, the volcano erupted, killing at least two people, injuring seven people, forcing many people to flee their villages. The volcano spat rocks for over 1.5 km (0.93 mi) with rocks the size of cars. The eruption contributed to the damage from Hurricane Stan. The most recent previous eruption had been in 1904.

The following table synthesizes the documented historical and modern eruptive activity of Santa Ana Volcano, including eruptive mechanisms, Volcanic Explosivity Index (VEI), and regional impacts:

Documented Historical Eruptions and Volcanic Activity of Santa Ana (Ilamatepec)
Eruption Period	Vent Location	Eruption Style & VEI	Geological & Environmental Impact
Late Pleistocene (~57,000 BP)	Central caldera	Edifice collapse (Debris avalanche)	Massive sector collapse of the ancestral volcanic cone, depositing a debris avalanche across 200 km² that extended to the Pacific coast and formed the Acajutla Peninsula.
1520, 1521, 1524	Summit crater	Explosive (VEI 2–3)	Early colonial tephra falls and persistent ash venting documented by early Spanish chroniclers.
1722 (San Marcelino)	East flank fissure	Effusive / Strombolian (VEI 2)	Lateral cinder cone and fissure eruption producing extensive basaltic lava flows that extended 11 km eastward, destroying the village of San Juan Tecpan.
1904 (January)	Summit crater lake	Phreatic / Phreatomagmatic (VEI 2)	Ash venting, hydrothermal steam explosions, and moderate tephra dispersal over the western Salvadoran highlands.
2005 (October 1)	Central crater	Phreatomagmatic / Vulcanian (VEI 3)	Sudden explosive eruption expelling blocks up to 1.5 km, producing an ash column exceeding 10,000 m, and triggering acid crater-lake floods and lahars compounded by Hurricane Stan.

== Climate ==
The climate on the northeast facing slope of the volcano sees substantial rainfall in the summer months. Located at 13.9 N, 89.6 W, altitude : 1770 m, the climate is classified as a subtropical highland climate (Köppen Cwb).

Climate data for Santa Ana, Volcano; 13.9 N, 89.6 W, altitude : 1771 m
Month	Jan	Feb	Mar	Apr	May	Jun	Jul	Aug	Sep	Oct	Nov	Dec	Year
Mean daily maximum °C (°F)	19.3 (66.7)	20.6 (69.1)	23.3 (73.9)	23.2 (73.8)	22.7 (72.9)	21.6 (70.9)	21.6 (70.9)	21.6 (70.9)	20.9 (69.6)	20.0 (68.0)	19.2 (66.6)	18.9 (66.0)	21.1 (69.9)
Daily mean °C (°F)	14.7 (58.5)	15.3 (59.5)	17.0 (62.6)	17.7 (63.9)	17.9 (64.2)	17.2 (63.0)	17.1 (62.8)	17.1 (62.8)	16.9 (62.4)	16.2 (61.2)	15.2 (59.4)	14.7 (58.5)	16.4 (61.6)
Mean daily minimum °C (°F)	11.2 (52.2)	11.6 (52.9)	12.8 (55.0)	13.9 (57.0)	14.6 (58.3)	14.3 (57.7)	14.0 (57.2)	14.0 (57.2)	14.2 (57.6)	13.6 (56.5)	12.7 (54.9)	11.8 (53.2)	13.2 (55.8)
Average precipitation mm (inches)	8 (0.3)	5 (0.2)	19 (0.7)	64 (2.5)	223 (8.8)	427 (16.8)	417 (16.4)	393 (15.5)	452 (17.8)	208 (8.2)	48 (1.9)	10 (0.4)	2,274 (89.5)
Source: HKO

== See also ==
- List of volcanoes in El Salvador
- List of stratovolcanoes
